

489001–489100 

|-bgcolor=#d6d6d6
| 489001 ||  || — || October 23, 2005 || Catalina || CSS || — || align=right | 2.7 km || 
|-id=002 bgcolor=#FA8072
| 489002 ||  || — || October 1, 2005 || Mount Lemmon || Mount Lemmon Survey || critical || align=right data-sort-value="0.71" | 710 m || 
|-id=003 bgcolor=#fefefe
| 489003 ||  || — || October 29, 2005 || Catalina || CSS || H || align=right data-sort-value="0.74" | 740 m || 
|-id=004 bgcolor=#E9E9E9
| 489004 ||  || — || November 3, 2005 || Kitt Peak || Spacewatch || — || align=right | 1.7 km || 
|-id=005 bgcolor=#E9E9E9
| 489005 ||  || — || October 24, 2005 || Kitt Peak || Spacewatch || AST || align=right | 1.4 km || 
|-id=006 bgcolor=#E9E9E9
| 489006 ||  || — || November 3, 2005 || Mount Lemmon || Mount Lemmon Survey || — || align=right | 2.1 km || 
|-id=007 bgcolor=#fefefe
| 489007 ||  || — || November 4, 2005 || Kitt Peak || Spacewatch || — || align=right data-sort-value="0.68" | 680 m || 
|-id=008 bgcolor=#fefefe
| 489008 ||  || — || October 27, 2005 || Catalina || CSS || H || align=right data-sort-value="0.60" | 600 m || 
|-id=009 bgcolor=#fefefe
| 489009 ||  || — || November 5, 2005 || Kitt Peak || Spacewatch || — || align=right data-sort-value="0.65" | 650 m || 
|-id=010 bgcolor=#d6d6d6
| 489010 ||  || — || October 29, 2005 || Mount Lemmon || Mount Lemmon Survey || KOR || align=right | 1.1 km || 
|-id=011 bgcolor=#d6d6d6
| 489011 ||  || — || November 6, 2005 || Kitt Peak || Spacewatch || BRA || align=right | 1.7 km || 
|-id=012 bgcolor=#E9E9E9
| 489012 ||  || — || October 25, 2005 || Kitt Peak || Spacewatch || — || align=right | 2.0 km || 
|-id=013 bgcolor=#fefefe
| 489013 ||  || — || November 10, 2005 || Mount Lemmon || Mount Lemmon Survey || — || align=right data-sort-value="0.77" | 770 m || 
|-id=014 bgcolor=#fefefe
| 489014 ||  || — || September 25, 2005 || Kitt Peak || Spacewatch || MAS || align=right data-sort-value="0.62" | 620 m || 
|-id=015 bgcolor=#E9E9E9
| 489015 ||  || — || November 21, 2005 || Kitt Peak || Spacewatch || — || align=right | 1.6 km || 
|-id=016 bgcolor=#d6d6d6
| 489016 ||  || — || November 10, 2005 || Mount Lemmon || Mount Lemmon Survey || — || align=right | 2.2 km || 
|-id=017 bgcolor=#fefefe
| 489017 ||  || — || November 22, 2005 || Kitt Peak || Spacewatch || — || align=right data-sort-value="0.70" | 700 m || 
|-id=018 bgcolor=#fefefe
| 489018 ||  || — || November 22, 2005 || Kitt Peak || Spacewatch || — || align=right data-sort-value="0.69" | 690 m || 
|-id=019 bgcolor=#fefefe
| 489019 ||  || — || October 28, 2005 || Mount Lemmon || Mount Lemmon Survey || — || align=right data-sort-value="0.62" | 620 m || 
|-id=020 bgcolor=#fefefe
| 489020 ||  || — || November 21, 2005 || Kitt Peak || Spacewatch || — || align=right data-sort-value="0.83" | 830 m || 
|-id=021 bgcolor=#d6d6d6
| 489021 ||  || — || October 27, 2005 || Mount Lemmon || Mount Lemmon Survey || — || align=right | 2.2 km || 
|-id=022 bgcolor=#d6d6d6
| 489022 ||  || — || November 3, 2005 || Kitt Peak || Spacewatch || KOR || align=right | 1.2 km || 
|-id=023 bgcolor=#E9E9E9
| 489023 ||  || — || November 22, 2005 || Kitt Peak || Spacewatch || — || align=right data-sort-value="0.62" | 620 m || 
|-id=024 bgcolor=#fefefe
| 489024 ||  || — || November 22, 2005 || Kitt Peak || Spacewatch || H || align=right data-sort-value="0.47" | 470 m || 
|-id=025 bgcolor=#d6d6d6
| 489025 ||  || — || October 25, 2005 || Mount Lemmon || Mount Lemmon Survey || KOR || align=right | 1.2 km || 
|-id=026 bgcolor=#d6d6d6
| 489026 ||  || — || October 27, 2005 || Mount Lemmon || Mount Lemmon Survey || — || align=right | 2.2 km || 
|-id=027 bgcolor=#fefefe
| 489027 ||  || — || November 25, 2005 || Mount Lemmon || Mount Lemmon Survey || H || align=right data-sort-value="0.65" | 650 m || 
|-id=028 bgcolor=#fefefe
| 489028 ||  || — || October 5, 2005 || Kitt Peak || Spacewatch || — || align=right data-sort-value="0.60" | 600 m || 
|-id=029 bgcolor=#fefefe
| 489029 ||  || — || November 30, 2005 || Kitt Peak || Spacewatch || — || align=right data-sort-value="0.46" | 460 m || 
|-id=030 bgcolor=#fefefe
| 489030 ||  || — || October 30, 2005 || Mount Lemmon || Mount Lemmon Survey || — || align=right data-sort-value="0.74" | 740 m || 
|-id=031 bgcolor=#E9E9E9
| 489031 ||  || — || November 25, 2005 || Mount Lemmon || Mount Lemmon Survey || — || align=right data-sort-value="0.82" | 820 m || 
|-id=032 bgcolor=#fefefe
| 489032 ||  || — || November 25, 2005 || Kitt Peak || Spacewatch || — || align=right data-sort-value="0.82" | 820 m || 
|-id=033 bgcolor=#fefefe
| 489033 ||  || — || November 25, 2005 || Mount Lemmon || Mount Lemmon Survey || — || align=right data-sort-value="0.77" | 770 m || 
|-id=034 bgcolor=#E9E9E9
| 489034 ||  || — || November 29, 2005 || Mount Lemmon || Mount Lemmon Survey || — || align=right | 1.1 km || 
|-id=035 bgcolor=#fefefe
| 489035 ||  || — || November 29, 2005 || Mount Lemmon || Mount Lemmon Survey || — || align=right data-sort-value="0.68" | 680 m || 
|-id=036 bgcolor=#E9E9E9
| 489036 ||  || — || November 25, 2005 || Catalina || CSS || — || align=right data-sort-value="0.87" | 870 m || 
|-id=037 bgcolor=#fefefe
| 489037 ||  || — || December 4, 2005 || Kitt Peak || Spacewatch || — || align=right data-sort-value="0.76" | 760 m || 
|-id=038 bgcolor=#E9E9E9
| 489038 ||  || — || December 3, 2005 || Kitt Peak || Spacewatch || — || align=right data-sort-value="0.77" | 770 m || 
|-id=039 bgcolor=#fefefe
| 489039 ||  || — || December 4, 2005 || Kitt Peak || Spacewatch || — || align=right data-sort-value="0.94" | 940 m || 
|-id=040 bgcolor=#d6d6d6
| 489040 ||  || — || December 8, 2005 || Kitt Peak || Spacewatch || — || align=right | 2.2 km || 
|-id=041 bgcolor=#fefefe
| 489041 ||  || — || December 8, 2005 || Kitt Peak || Spacewatch || — || align=right data-sort-value="0.68" | 680 m || 
|-id=042 bgcolor=#fefefe
| 489042 ||  || — || December 5, 2005 || Kitt Peak || Spacewatch || — || align=right data-sort-value="0.60" | 600 m || 
|-id=043 bgcolor=#fefefe
| 489043 ||  || — || November 30, 2005 || Kitt Peak || Spacewatch || MAS || align=right data-sort-value="0.62" | 620 m || 
|-id=044 bgcolor=#E9E9E9
| 489044 ||  || — || December 23, 2005 || Kitt Peak || Spacewatch || — || align=right | 1.4 km || 
|-id=045 bgcolor=#fefefe
| 489045 ||  || — || December 22, 2005 || Kitt Peak || Spacewatch || NYS || align=right data-sort-value="0.58" | 580 m || 
|-id=046 bgcolor=#d6d6d6
| 489046 ||  || — || December 24, 2005 || Kitt Peak || Spacewatch || EOS || align=right | 1.7 km || 
|-id=047 bgcolor=#d6d6d6
| 489047 ||  || — || December 24, 2005 || Kitt Peak || Spacewatch || — || align=right | 1.9 km || 
|-id=048 bgcolor=#E9E9E9
| 489048 ||  || — || December 25, 2005 || Kitt Peak || Spacewatch || — || align=right data-sort-value="0.87" | 870 m || 
|-id=049 bgcolor=#fefefe
| 489049 ||  || — || November 25, 2005 || Mount Lemmon || Mount Lemmon Survey || V || align=right data-sort-value="0.50" | 500 m || 
|-id=050 bgcolor=#fefefe
| 489050 ||  || — || December 26, 2005 || Kitt Peak || Spacewatch || — || align=right data-sort-value="0.68" | 680 m || 
|-id=051 bgcolor=#fefefe
| 489051 ||  || — || December 1, 2005 || Mount Lemmon || Mount Lemmon Survey || H || align=right data-sort-value="0.52" | 520 m || 
|-id=052 bgcolor=#E9E9E9
| 489052 ||  || — || December 2, 2005 || Mount Lemmon || Mount Lemmon Survey || MRX || align=right data-sort-value="0.95" | 950 m || 
|-id=053 bgcolor=#FA8072
| 489053 ||  || — || December 27, 2005 || Catalina || CSS || — || align=right data-sort-value="0.68" | 680 m || 
|-id=054 bgcolor=#d6d6d6
| 489054 ||  || — || December 25, 2005 || Kitt Peak || Spacewatch || — || align=right | 2.3 km || 
|-id=055 bgcolor=#E9E9E9
| 489055 ||  || — || December 25, 2005 || Kitt Peak || Spacewatch || — || align=right data-sort-value="0.85" | 850 m || 
|-id=056 bgcolor=#fefefe
| 489056 ||  || — || December 24, 2005 || Socorro || LINEAR || H || align=right data-sort-value="0.81" | 810 m || 
|-id=057 bgcolor=#fefefe
| 489057 ||  || — || December 27, 2005 || Kitt Peak || Spacewatch || H || align=right data-sort-value="0.76" | 760 m || 
|-id=058 bgcolor=#fefefe
| 489058 ||  || — || December 26, 2005 || Kitt Peak || Spacewatch || — || align=right data-sort-value="0.76" | 760 m || 
|-id=059 bgcolor=#fefefe
| 489059 ||  || — || December 29, 2005 || Socorro || LINEAR || H || align=right data-sort-value="0.69" | 690 m || 
|-id=060 bgcolor=#fefefe
| 489060 ||  || — || December 28, 2005 || Mount Lemmon || Mount Lemmon Survey || — || align=right data-sort-value="0.71" | 710 m || 
|-id=061 bgcolor=#d6d6d6
| 489061 ||  || — || December 30, 2005 || Kitt Peak || Spacewatch || — || align=right | 2.2 km || 
|-id=062 bgcolor=#fefefe
| 489062 ||  || — || December 25, 2005 || Mount Lemmon || Mount Lemmon Survey || NYS || align=right data-sort-value="0.59" | 590 m || 
|-id=063 bgcolor=#fefefe
| 489063 ||  || — || December 29, 2005 || Kitt Peak || Spacewatch || V || align=right data-sort-value="0.56" | 560 m || 
|-id=064 bgcolor=#d6d6d6
| 489064 ||  || — || August 22, 2004 || Kitt Peak || Spacewatch || — || align=right | 2.2 km || 
|-id=065 bgcolor=#d6d6d6
| 489065 ||  || — || December 28, 2005 || Kitt Peak || Spacewatch || — || align=right | 1.7 km || 
|-id=066 bgcolor=#fefefe
| 489066 ||  || — || December 28, 2005 || Kitt Peak || Spacewatch || — || align=right data-sort-value="0.73" | 730 m || 
|-id=067 bgcolor=#d6d6d6
| 489067 ||  || — || December 25, 2005 || Kitt Peak || Spacewatch || KOR || align=right data-sort-value="0.96" | 960 m || 
|-id=068 bgcolor=#fefefe
| 489068 ||  || — || December 30, 2005 || Mount Lemmon || Mount Lemmon Survey || — || align=right data-sort-value="0.49" | 490 m || 
|-id=069 bgcolor=#fefefe
| 489069 ||  || — || January 2, 2006 || Mount Lemmon || Mount Lemmon Survey || — || align=right data-sort-value="0.68" | 680 m || 
|-id=070 bgcolor=#fefefe
| 489070 ||  || — || January 2, 2006 || Mount Lemmon || Mount Lemmon Survey || H || align=right data-sort-value="0.50" | 500 m || 
|-id=071 bgcolor=#fefefe
| 489071 ||  || — || January 2, 2006 || Socorro || LINEAR || — || align=right data-sort-value="0.94" | 940 m || 
|-id=072 bgcolor=#d6d6d6
| 489072 ||  || — || December 28, 2005 || Kitt Peak || Spacewatch || 7:4 || align=right | 2.9 km || 
|-id=073 bgcolor=#fefefe
| 489073 ||  || — || December 22, 2005 || Kitt Peak || Spacewatch || — || align=right data-sort-value="0.62" | 620 m || 
|-id=074 bgcolor=#fefefe
| 489074 ||  || — || December 29, 2005 || Socorro || LINEAR || — || align=right data-sort-value="0.81" | 810 m || 
|-id=075 bgcolor=#fefefe
| 489075 ||  || — || December 5, 2005 || Mount Lemmon || Mount Lemmon Survey || — || align=right data-sort-value="0.62" | 620 m || 
|-id=076 bgcolor=#fefefe
| 489076 ||  || — || January 7, 2006 || Kitt Peak || Spacewatch || NYS || align=right data-sort-value="0.55" | 550 m || 
|-id=077 bgcolor=#d6d6d6
| 489077 ||  || — || January 7, 2006 || Mount Lemmon || Mount Lemmon Survey || — || align=right | 2.4 km || 
|-id=078 bgcolor=#fefefe
| 489078 ||  || — || January 5, 2006 || Kitt Peak || Spacewatch || — || align=right data-sort-value="0.62" | 620 m || 
|-id=079 bgcolor=#d6d6d6
| 489079 ||  || — || January 5, 2006 || Kitt Peak || Spacewatch || EOS || align=right | 1.8 km || 
|-id=080 bgcolor=#d6d6d6
| 489080 ||  || — || December 28, 2005 || Kitt Peak || Spacewatch || — || align=right | 2.1 km || 
|-id=081 bgcolor=#E9E9E9
| 489081 ||  || — || January 9, 2006 || Kitt Peak || Spacewatch || — || align=right data-sort-value="0.74" | 740 m || 
|-id=082 bgcolor=#d6d6d6
| 489082 ||  || — || January 5, 2006 || Kitt Peak || Spacewatch || INA || align=right | 2.8 km || 
|-id=083 bgcolor=#C2FFFF
| 489083 ||  || — || January 7, 2006 || Mount Lemmon || Mount Lemmon Survey || L5 || align=right | 12 km || 
|-id=084 bgcolor=#fefefe
| 489084 ||  || — || January 7, 2006 || Mount Lemmon || Mount Lemmon Survey || — || align=right data-sort-value="0.63" | 630 m || 
|-id=085 bgcolor=#E9E9E9
| 489085 ||  || — || January 7, 2006 || Mount Lemmon || Mount Lemmon Survey || — || align=right | 1.3 km || 
|-id=086 bgcolor=#fefefe
| 489086 ||  || — || January 5, 2006 || Mount Lemmon || Mount Lemmon Survey || — || align=right data-sort-value="0.76" | 760 m || 
|-id=087 bgcolor=#fefefe
| 489087 ||  || — || December 5, 2005 || Mount Lemmon || Mount Lemmon Survey || (2076) || align=right | 1.1 km || 
|-id=088 bgcolor=#fefefe
| 489088 ||  || — || January 25, 2006 || Kitt Peak || Spacewatch || — || align=right | 1.5 km || 
|-id=089 bgcolor=#d6d6d6
| 489089 ||  || — || January 25, 2006 || Kitt Peak || Spacewatch || — || align=right | 1.8 km || 
|-id=090 bgcolor=#fefefe
| 489090 ||  || — || January 23, 2006 || Kitt Peak || Spacewatch || — || align=right | 1.3 km || 
|-id=091 bgcolor=#E9E9E9
| 489091 ||  || — || January 22, 2006 || Catalina || CSS || — || align=right data-sort-value="0.88" | 880 m || 
|-id=092 bgcolor=#fefefe
| 489092 ||  || — || January 23, 2006 || Kitt Peak || Spacewatch || — || align=right data-sort-value="0.78" | 780 m || 
|-id=093 bgcolor=#fefefe
| 489093 ||  || — || January 23, 2006 || Kitt Peak || Spacewatch || — || align=right data-sort-value="0.60" | 600 m || 
|-id=094 bgcolor=#d6d6d6
| 489094 ||  || — || January 10, 2006 || Mount Lemmon || Mount Lemmon Survey || — || align=right | 2.7 km || 
|-id=095 bgcolor=#fefefe
| 489095 ||  || — || January 25, 2006 || Kitt Peak || Spacewatch || — || align=right data-sort-value="0.77" | 770 m || 
|-id=096 bgcolor=#d6d6d6
| 489096 ||  || — || January 25, 2006 || Kitt Peak || Spacewatch || — || align=right | 2.5 km || 
|-id=097 bgcolor=#fefefe
| 489097 ||  || — || January 26, 2006 || Kitt Peak || Spacewatch || NYS || align=right data-sort-value="0.49" | 490 m || 
|-id=098 bgcolor=#d6d6d6
| 489098 ||  || — || January 25, 2006 || Kitt Peak || Spacewatch || — || align=right | 1.9 km || 
|-id=099 bgcolor=#fefefe
| 489099 ||  || — || January 27, 2006 || Mount Lemmon || Mount Lemmon Survey || MAS || align=right data-sort-value="0.49" | 490 m || 
|-id=100 bgcolor=#d6d6d6
| 489100 ||  || — || January 28, 2006 || Mount Lemmon || Mount Lemmon Survey || 3:2 || align=right | 3.9 km || 
|}

489101–489200 

|-bgcolor=#C2FFFF
| 489101 ||  || — || January 28, 2006 || Kitt Peak || Spacewatch || L5 || align=right | 9.7 km || 
|-id=102 bgcolor=#d6d6d6
| 489102 ||  || — || January 31, 2006 || Kitt Peak || Spacewatch || EOS || align=right | 1.4 km || 
|-id=103 bgcolor=#d6d6d6
| 489103 ||  || — || January 31, 2006 || Mount Lemmon || Mount Lemmon Survey || — || align=right | 2.0 km || 
|-id=104 bgcolor=#fefefe
| 489104 ||  || — || January 22, 2006 || Catalina || CSS || H || align=right data-sort-value="0.80" | 800 m || 
|-id=105 bgcolor=#d6d6d6
| 489105 ||  || — || January 28, 2006 || Catalina || CSS || — || align=right | 3.2 km || 
|-id=106 bgcolor=#fefefe
| 489106 ||  || — || January 28, 2006 || Mount Lemmon || Mount Lemmon Survey || — || align=right data-sort-value="0.82" | 820 m || 
|-id=107 bgcolor=#fefefe
| 489107 ||  || — || January 5, 2006 || Mount Lemmon || Mount Lemmon Survey || (5026) || align=right data-sort-value="0.57" | 570 m || 
|-id=108 bgcolor=#fefefe
| 489108 ||  || — || January 31, 2006 || Kitt Peak || Spacewatch || — || align=right data-sort-value="0.89" | 890 m || 
|-id=109 bgcolor=#fefefe
| 489109 ||  || — || January 31, 2006 || Kitt Peak || Spacewatch || — || align=right data-sort-value="0.53" | 530 m || 
|-id=110 bgcolor=#fefefe
| 489110 ||  || — || January 31, 2006 || Mount Lemmon || Mount Lemmon Survey || — || align=right data-sort-value="0.68" | 680 m || 
|-id=111 bgcolor=#d6d6d6
| 489111 ||  || — || January 25, 2006 || Kitt Peak || Spacewatch || — || align=right | 2.1 km || 
|-id=112 bgcolor=#fefefe
| 489112 ||  || — || January 31, 2006 || Kitt Peak || Spacewatch || — || align=right data-sort-value="0.57" | 570 m || 
|-id=113 bgcolor=#fefefe
| 489113 ||  || — || January 31, 2006 || Kitt Peak || Spacewatch || — || align=right data-sort-value="0.68" | 680 m || 
|-id=114 bgcolor=#fefefe
| 489114 ||  || — || January 26, 2006 || Mount Lemmon || Mount Lemmon Survey || — || align=right data-sort-value="0.78" | 780 m || 
|-id=115 bgcolor=#d6d6d6
| 489115 ||  || — || December 6, 2005 || Mount Lemmon || Mount Lemmon Survey || — || align=right | 2.4 km || 
|-id=116 bgcolor=#fefefe
| 489116 ||  || — || January 26, 2006 || Kitt Peak || Spacewatch || — || align=right data-sort-value="0.56" | 560 m || 
|-id=117 bgcolor=#E9E9E9
| 489117 ||  || — || February 1, 2006 || Kitt Peak || Spacewatch || — || align=right data-sort-value="0.80" | 800 m || 
|-id=118 bgcolor=#fefefe
| 489118 ||  || — || November 10, 2005 || Kitt Peak || Spacewatch || H || align=right data-sort-value="0.81" | 810 m || 
|-id=119 bgcolor=#d6d6d6
| 489119 ||  || — || January 23, 2006 || Mount Lemmon || Mount Lemmon Survey || — || align=right | 2.9 km || 
|-id=120 bgcolor=#d6d6d6
| 489120 ||  || — || February 2, 2006 || Mount Lemmon || Mount Lemmon Survey || — || align=right | 3.3 km || 
|-id=121 bgcolor=#d6d6d6
| 489121 ||  || — || February 2, 2006 || Kitt Peak || Spacewatch || — || align=right | 2.5 km || 
|-id=122 bgcolor=#E9E9E9
| 489122 ||  || — || February 3, 2006 || Kitt Peak || Spacewatch || — || align=right | 1.0 km || 
|-id=123 bgcolor=#fefefe
| 489123 ||  || — || December 6, 2005 || Mount Lemmon || Mount Lemmon Survey || — || align=right data-sort-value="0.65" | 650 m || 
|-id=124 bgcolor=#fefefe
| 489124 ||  || — || February 7, 2006 || Kitt Peak || Spacewatch || — || align=right data-sort-value="0.75" | 750 m || 
|-id=125 bgcolor=#fefefe
| 489125 ||  || — || January 31, 2006 || Kitt Peak || Spacewatch || — || align=right data-sort-value="0.60" | 600 m || 
|-id=126 bgcolor=#d6d6d6
| 489126 ||  || — || February 20, 2006 || Kitt Peak || Spacewatch || THM || align=right | 2.3 km || 
|-id=127 bgcolor=#fefefe
| 489127 ||  || — || February 20, 2006 || Kitt Peak || Spacewatch || — || align=right data-sort-value="0.75" | 750 m || 
|-id=128 bgcolor=#E9E9E9
| 489128 ||  || — || February 20, 2006 || Kitt Peak || Spacewatch || — || align=right | 2.1 km || 
|-id=129 bgcolor=#fefefe
| 489129 ||  || — || February 21, 2006 || Mount Lemmon || Mount Lemmon Survey || NYS || align=right data-sort-value="0.52" | 520 m || 
|-id=130 bgcolor=#fefefe
| 489130 ||  || — || February 24, 2006 || Kitt Peak || Spacewatch || — || align=right data-sort-value="0.54" | 540 m || 
|-id=131 bgcolor=#d6d6d6
| 489131 ||  || — || February 2, 2006 || Mount Lemmon || Mount Lemmon Survey || — || align=right | 3.2 km || 
|-id=132 bgcolor=#d6d6d6
| 489132 ||  || — || February 24, 2006 || Kitt Peak || Spacewatch || — || align=right | 2.9 km || 
|-id=133 bgcolor=#fefefe
| 489133 ||  || — || February 1, 2006 || Mount Lemmon || Mount Lemmon Survey || NYS || align=right data-sort-value="0.55" | 550 m || 
|-id=134 bgcolor=#d6d6d6
| 489134 ||  || — || January 26, 2006 || Mount Lemmon || Mount Lemmon Survey || EOS || align=right | 1.6 km || 
|-id=135 bgcolor=#d6d6d6
| 489135 ||  || — || February 25, 2006 || Mount Lemmon || Mount Lemmon Survey || — || align=right | 2.1 km || 
|-id=136 bgcolor=#d6d6d6
| 489136 ||  || — || September 30, 2003 || Kitt Peak || Spacewatch || — || align=right | 2.4 km || 
|-id=137 bgcolor=#fefefe
| 489137 ||  || — || February 27, 2006 || Kitt Peak || Spacewatch || MAS || align=right data-sort-value="0.68" | 680 m || 
|-id=138 bgcolor=#fefefe
| 489138 ||  || — || January 30, 2006 || Kitt Peak || Spacewatch || — || align=right data-sort-value="0.60" | 600 m || 
|-id=139 bgcolor=#fefefe
| 489139 ||  || — || February 25, 2006 || Mount Lemmon || Mount Lemmon Survey || MAS || align=right data-sort-value="0.65" | 650 m || 
|-id=140 bgcolor=#fefefe
| 489140 ||  || — || February 25, 2006 || Kitt Peak || Spacewatch || — || align=right data-sort-value="0.68" | 680 m || 
|-id=141 bgcolor=#d6d6d6
| 489141 ||  || — || February 25, 2006 || Kitt Peak || Spacewatch || — || align=right | 2.4 km || 
|-id=142 bgcolor=#fefefe
| 489142 ||  || — || February 25, 2006 || Mount Lemmon || Mount Lemmon Survey || — || align=right data-sort-value="0.58" | 580 m || 
|-id=143 bgcolor=#fefefe
| 489143 ||  || — || February 25, 2006 || Mount Lemmon || Mount Lemmon Survey || — || align=right data-sort-value="0.60" | 600 m || 
|-id=144 bgcolor=#E9E9E9
| 489144 ||  || — || February 25, 2006 || Kitt Peak || Spacewatch || — || align=right | 1.1 km || 
|-id=145 bgcolor=#fefefe
| 489145 ||  || — || February 27, 2006 || Kitt Peak || Spacewatch || NYS || align=right data-sort-value="0.58" | 580 m || 
|-id=146 bgcolor=#fefefe
| 489146 ||  || — || February 27, 2006 || Kitt Peak || Spacewatch || — || align=right | 1.5 km || 
|-id=147 bgcolor=#d6d6d6
| 489147 ||  || — || February 27, 2006 || Kitt Peak || Spacewatch || — || align=right | 2.1 km || 
|-id=148 bgcolor=#d6d6d6
| 489148 ||  || — || January 7, 2006 || Mount Lemmon || Mount Lemmon Survey || LIX || align=right | 2.7 km || 
|-id=149 bgcolor=#d6d6d6
| 489149 ||  || — || February 27, 2006 || Kitt Peak || Spacewatch || — || align=right | 1.9 km || 
|-id=150 bgcolor=#d6d6d6
| 489150 ||  || — || February 27, 2006 || Mount Lemmon || Mount Lemmon Survey || — || align=right | 2.7 km || 
|-id=151 bgcolor=#d6d6d6
| 489151 ||  || — || February 28, 2006 || Mount Lemmon || Mount Lemmon Survey || critical || align=right | 2.4 km || 
|-id=152 bgcolor=#FA8072
| 489152 ||  || — || February 27, 2006 || Kitt Peak || Spacewatch || — || align=right data-sort-value="0.71" | 710 m || 
|-id=153 bgcolor=#d6d6d6
| 489153 ||  || — || March 2, 2006 || Kitt Peak || Spacewatch || — || align=right | 2.1 km || 
|-id=154 bgcolor=#d6d6d6
| 489154 ||  || — || March 2, 2006 || Kitt Peak || Spacewatch || — || align=right | 2.6 km || 
|-id=155 bgcolor=#d6d6d6
| 489155 ||  || — || March 2, 2006 || Kitt Peak || Spacewatch || — || align=right | 2.3 km || 
|-id=156 bgcolor=#fefefe
| 489156 ||  || — || March 3, 2006 || Kitt Peak || Spacewatch || MAS || align=right data-sort-value="0.52" | 520 m || 
|-id=157 bgcolor=#fefefe
| 489157 ||  || — || March 3, 2006 || Kitt Peak || Spacewatch || — || align=right data-sort-value="0.70" | 700 m || 
|-id=158 bgcolor=#d6d6d6
| 489158 ||  || — || February 25, 2006 || Mount Lemmon || Mount Lemmon Survey || — || align=right | 2.5 km || 
|-id=159 bgcolor=#d6d6d6
| 489159 ||  || — || March 4, 2006 || Kitt Peak || Spacewatch || — || align=right | 2.0 km || 
|-id=160 bgcolor=#d6d6d6
| 489160 ||  || — || March 4, 2006 || Kitt Peak || Spacewatch || THM || align=right | 1.8 km || 
|-id=161 bgcolor=#fefefe
| 489161 ||  || — || March 4, 2006 || Kitt Peak || Spacewatch || — || align=right data-sort-value="0.68" | 680 m || 
|-id=162 bgcolor=#d6d6d6
| 489162 ||  || — || March 3, 2006 || Mount Lemmon || Mount Lemmon Survey || — || align=right | 2.8 km || 
|-id=163 bgcolor=#d6d6d6
| 489163 ||  || — || February 1, 2006 || Kitt Peak || Spacewatch || — || align=right | 2.7 km || 
|-id=164 bgcolor=#fefefe
| 489164 ||  || — || March 23, 2006 || Kitt Peak || Spacewatch || H || align=right data-sort-value="0.79" | 790 m || 
|-id=165 bgcolor=#fefefe
| 489165 ||  || — || March 23, 2006 || Kitt Peak || Spacewatch || — || align=right data-sort-value="0.68" | 680 m || 
|-id=166 bgcolor=#d6d6d6
| 489166 ||  || — || March 24, 2006 || Bergisch Gladbach || W. Bickel || Tj (2.99) || align=right | 3.7 km || 
|-id=167 bgcolor=#E9E9E9
| 489167 ||  || — || March 2, 2006 || Kitt Peak || Spacewatch || — || align=right | 1.6 km || 
|-id=168 bgcolor=#d6d6d6
| 489168 ||  || — || March 24, 2006 || Mount Lemmon || Mount Lemmon Survey || — || align=right | 3.0 km || 
|-id=169 bgcolor=#d6d6d6
| 489169 ||  || — || March 24, 2006 || Mount Lemmon || Mount Lemmon Survey || — || align=right | 3.0 km || 
|-id=170 bgcolor=#d6d6d6
| 489170 ||  || — || March 25, 2006 || Catalina || CSS || — || align=right | 5.0 km || 
|-id=171 bgcolor=#fefefe
| 489171 ||  || — || February 28, 2006 || Mount Lemmon || Mount Lemmon Survey || — || align=right data-sort-value="0.62" | 620 m || 
|-id=172 bgcolor=#d6d6d6
| 489172 ||  || — || March 26, 2006 || Mount Lemmon || Mount Lemmon Survey || THM || align=right | 2.1 km || 
|-id=173 bgcolor=#fefefe
| 489173 ||  || — || April 2, 2006 || Kitt Peak || Spacewatch || — || align=right data-sort-value="0.79" | 790 m || 
|-id=174 bgcolor=#d6d6d6
| 489174 ||  || — || March 25, 2006 || Mount Lemmon || Mount Lemmon Survey || EOS || align=right | 1.7 km || 
|-id=175 bgcolor=#fefefe
| 489175 ||  || — || March 25, 2006 || Kitt Peak || Spacewatch || — || align=right data-sort-value="0.89" | 890 m || 
|-id=176 bgcolor=#d6d6d6
| 489176 ||  || — || March 25, 2006 || Kitt Peak || Spacewatch || — || align=right | 2.5 km || 
|-id=177 bgcolor=#d6d6d6
| 489177 ||  || — || April 7, 2006 || Kitt Peak || Spacewatch || — || align=right | 3.1 km || 
|-id=178 bgcolor=#d6d6d6
| 489178 ||  || — || March 24, 2006 || Socorro || LINEAR || — || align=right | 3.1 km || 
|-id=179 bgcolor=#d6d6d6
| 489179 ||  || — || March 24, 2006 || Kitt Peak || Spacewatch || — || align=right | 2.3 km || 
|-id=180 bgcolor=#fefefe
| 489180 ||  || — || April 9, 2006 || Mount Lemmon || Mount Lemmon Survey || — || align=right data-sort-value="0.74" | 740 m || 
|-id=181 bgcolor=#d6d6d6
| 489181 ||  || — || February 25, 2006 || Mount Lemmon || Mount Lemmon Survey || — || align=right | 2.0 km || 
|-id=182 bgcolor=#d6d6d6
| 489182 ||  || — || April 19, 2006 || Kitt Peak || Spacewatch || — || align=right | 2.5 km || 
|-id=183 bgcolor=#fefefe
| 489183 ||  || — || April 19, 2006 || Mount Lemmon || Mount Lemmon Survey || — || align=right data-sort-value="0.65" | 650 m || 
|-id=184 bgcolor=#d6d6d6
| 489184 ||  || — || April 19, 2006 || Kitt Peak || Spacewatch || — || align=right | 2.6 km || 
|-id=185 bgcolor=#d6d6d6
| 489185 ||  || — || April 20, 2006 || Kitt Peak || Spacewatch || LIX || align=right | 3.0 km || 
|-id=186 bgcolor=#fefefe
| 489186 ||  || — || April 20, 2006 || Kitt Peak || Spacewatch || — || align=right data-sort-value="0.78" | 780 m || 
|-id=187 bgcolor=#d6d6d6
| 489187 ||  || — || April 20, 2006 || Kitt Peak || Spacewatch || THM || align=right | 2.1 km || 
|-id=188 bgcolor=#d6d6d6
| 489188 ||  || — || April 20, 2006 || Kitt Peak || Spacewatch || — || align=right | 3.4 km || 
|-id=189 bgcolor=#fefefe
| 489189 ||  || — || April 2, 2006 || Kitt Peak || Spacewatch || — || align=right data-sort-value="0.63" | 630 m || 
|-id=190 bgcolor=#fefefe
| 489190 ||  || — || April 24, 2006 || Kitt Peak || Spacewatch || — || align=right | 1.5 km || 
|-id=191 bgcolor=#d6d6d6
| 489191 ||  || — || April 25, 2006 || Kitt Peak || Spacewatch || HYG || align=right | 2.5 km || 
|-id=192 bgcolor=#fefefe
| 489192 ||  || — || April 25, 2006 || Kitt Peak || Spacewatch || NYS || align=right data-sort-value="0.48" | 480 m || 
|-id=193 bgcolor=#d6d6d6
| 489193 ||  || — || April 25, 2006 || Kitt Peak || Spacewatch || — || align=right | 2.5 km || 
|-id=194 bgcolor=#d6d6d6
| 489194 ||  || — || April 25, 2006 || Kitt Peak || Spacewatch || — || align=right | 2.5 km || 
|-id=195 bgcolor=#d6d6d6
| 489195 ||  || — || April 25, 2006 || Kitt Peak || Spacewatch || LIX || align=right | 3.5 km || 
|-id=196 bgcolor=#d6d6d6
| 489196 ||  || — || April 25, 2006 || Kitt Peak || Spacewatch || EOS || align=right | 2.3 km || 
|-id=197 bgcolor=#d6d6d6
| 489197 ||  || — || April 26, 2006 || Kitt Peak || Spacewatch || — || align=right | 2.6 km || 
|-id=198 bgcolor=#fefefe
| 489198 ||  || — || April 26, 2006 || Kitt Peak || Spacewatch || MAS || align=right data-sort-value="0.62" | 620 m || 
|-id=199 bgcolor=#d6d6d6
| 489199 ||  || — || April 30, 2006 || Kitt Peak || Spacewatch || — || align=right | 3.9 km || 
|-id=200 bgcolor=#fefefe
| 489200 ||  || — || April 30, 2006 || Kitt Peak || Spacewatch || — || align=right data-sort-value="0.72" | 720 m || 
|}

489201–489300 

|-bgcolor=#d6d6d6
| 489201 ||  || — || April 26, 2006 || Kitt Peak || Spacewatch || — || align=right | 3.1 km || 
|-id=202 bgcolor=#d6d6d6
| 489202 ||  || — || April 30, 2006 || Kitt Peak || Spacewatch || — || align=right | 2.8 km || 
|-id=203 bgcolor=#FFC2E0
| 489203 ||  || — || May 3, 2006 || Mount Lemmon || Mount Lemmon Survey || AMO || align=right | 1.5 km || 
|-id=204 bgcolor=#d6d6d6
| 489204 ||  || — || May 1, 2006 || Kitt Peak || Spacewatch || — || align=right | 2.9 km || 
|-id=205 bgcolor=#d6d6d6
| 489205 ||  || — || May 2, 2006 || Mount Lemmon || Mount Lemmon Survey || — || align=right | 2.7 km || 
|-id=206 bgcolor=#d6d6d6
| 489206 ||  || — || May 2, 2006 || Kitt Peak || Spacewatch || — || align=right | 2.5 km || 
|-id=207 bgcolor=#d6d6d6
| 489207 ||  || — || May 1, 2006 || Kitt Peak || Spacewatch || — || align=right | 2.9 km || 
|-id=208 bgcolor=#fefefe
| 489208 ||  || — || May 2, 2006 || Mount Lemmon || Mount Lemmon Survey || — || align=right data-sort-value="0.67" | 670 m || 
|-id=209 bgcolor=#fefefe
| 489209 ||  || — || April 8, 2006 || Kitt Peak || Spacewatch || — || align=right data-sort-value="0.69" | 690 m || 
|-id=210 bgcolor=#fefefe
| 489210 ||  || — || May 2, 2006 || Mount Lemmon || Mount Lemmon Survey || — || align=right data-sort-value="0.68" | 680 m || 
|-id=211 bgcolor=#E9E9E9
| 489211 ||  || — || May 1, 2006 || Mauna Kea || P. A. Wiegert || — || align=right data-sort-value="0.68" | 680 m || 
|-id=212 bgcolor=#d6d6d6
| 489212 ||  || — || March 25, 2006 || Kitt Peak || Spacewatch || THM || align=right | 1.9 km || 
|-id=213 bgcolor=#fefefe
| 489213 ||  || — || May 20, 2006 || Mount Lemmon || Mount Lemmon Survey || — || align=right | 1.2 km || 
|-id=214 bgcolor=#d6d6d6
| 489214 ||  || — || May 1, 2006 || Catalina || CSS || THB || align=right | 3.3 km || 
|-id=215 bgcolor=#d6d6d6
| 489215 ||  || — || May 21, 2006 || Kitt Peak || Spacewatch || — || align=right | 3.4 km || 
|-id=216 bgcolor=#FA8072
| 489216 ||  || — || May 17, 2006 || Palomar || NEAT || — || align=right data-sort-value="0.39" | 390 m || 
|-id=217 bgcolor=#d6d6d6
| 489217 ||  || — || May 21, 2006 || Mount Lemmon || Mount Lemmon Survey || THB || align=right | 2.1 km || 
|-id=218 bgcolor=#d6d6d6
| 489218 ||  || — || May 6, 2006 || Mount Lemmon || Mount Lemmon Survey || VER || align=right | 2.6 km || 
|-id=219 bgcolor=#fefefe
| 489219 ||  || — || May 21, 2006 || Kitt Peak || Spacewatch || — || align=right data-sort-value="0.70" | 700 m || 
|-id=220 bgcolor=#fefefe
| 489220 ||  || — || May 21, 2006 || Kitt Peak || Spacewatch || — || align=right data-sort-value="0.62" | 620 m || 
|-id=221 bgcolor=#d6d6d6
| 489221 ||  || — || May 3, 2006 || Kitt Peak || Spacewatch || — || align=right | 2.4 km || 
|-id=222 bgcolor=#fefefe
| 489222 ||  || — || May 22, 2006 || Kitt Peak || Spacewatch || — || align=right data-sort-value="0.57" | 570 m || 
|-id=223 bgcolor=#d6d6d6
| 489223 ||  || — || May 9, 2006 || Mount Lemmon || Mount Lemmon Survey || — || align=right | 2.8 km || 
|-id=224 bgcolor=#d6d6d6
| 489224 ||  || — || May 22, 2006 || Kitt Peak || Spacewatch || — || align=right | 3.2 km || 
|-id=225 bgcolor=#d6d6d6
| 489225 ||  || — || May 9, 2006 || Mount Lemmon || Mount Lemmon Survey || — || align=right | 2.7 km || 
|-id=226 bgcolor=#d6d6d6
| 489226 ||  || — || May 20, 2006 || Kitt Peak || Spacewatch || — || align=right | 2.5 km || 
|-id=227 bgcolor=#fefefe
| 489227 ||  || — || May 31, 2006 || Mount Lemmon || Mount Lemmon Survey || — || align=right data-sort-value="0.77" | 770 m || 
|-id=228 bgcolor=#fefefe
| 489228 ||  || — || May 6, 2006 || Kitt Peak || Spacewatch || — || align=right data-sort-value="0.82" | 820 m || 
|-id=229 bgcolor=#d6d6d6
| 489229 ||  || — || May 31, 2006 || Kitt Peak || Spacewatch || — || align=right | 3.2 km || 
|-id=230 bgcolor=#fefefe
| 489230 ||  || — || June 18, 2006 || Kitt Peak || Spacewatch || — || align=right data-sort-value="0.74" | 740 m || 
|-id=231 bgcolor=#FA8072
| 489231 ||  || — || July 21, 2006 || Mount Lemmon || Mount Lemmon Survey || critical || align=right data-sort-value="0.49" | 490 m || 
|-id=232 bgcolor=#E9E9E9
| 489232 ||  || — || August 14, 2006 || Siding Spring || SSS || BRG || align=right | 1.5 km || 
|-id=233 bgcolor=#FA8072
| 489233 ||  || — || August 20, 2006 || Kitt Peak || Spacewatch || critical || align=right data-sort-value="0.52" | 520 m || 
|-id=234 bgcolor=#d6d6d6
| 489234 ||  || — || August 19, 2006 || Anderson Mesa || LONEOS || — || align=right | 2.8 km || 
|-id=235 bgcolor=#FFC2E0
| 489235 ||  || — || August 28, 2006 || Anderson Mesa || LONEOS || AMO || align=right data-sort-value="0.30" | 300 m || 
|-id=236 bgcolor=#d6d6d6
| 489236 ||  || — || August 28, 2006 || La Sagra || OAM Obs. || — || align=right | 2.5 km || 
|-id=237 bgcolor=#fefefe
| 489237 ||  || — || August 24, 2006 || Socorro || LINEAR || — || align=right data-sort-value="0.65" | 650 m || 
|-id=238 bgcolor=#E9E9E9
| 489238 ||  || — || July 18, 2006 || Mount Lemmon || Mount Lemmon Survey || (194) || align=right | 1.7 km || 
|-id=239 bgcolor=#E9E9E9
| 489239 ||  || — || August 29, 2006 || Anderson Mesa || LONEOS || EUN || align=right | 1.1 km || 
|-id=240 bgcolor=#d6d6d6
| 489240 ||  || — || August 18, 2006 || Kitt Peak || Spacewatch || — || align=right | 1.9 km || 
|-id=241 bgcolor=#d6d6d6
| 489241 ||  || — || August 19, 2006 || Kitt Peak || Spacewatch || — || align=right | 1.9 km || 
|-id=242 bgcolor=#E9E9E9
| 489242 ||  || — || August 28, 2006 || Catalina || CSS || — || align=right | 1.5 km || 
|-id=243 bgcolor=#d6d6d6
| 489243 ||  || — || August 29, 2006 || Catalina || CSS || — || align=right | 2.9 km || 
|-id=244 bgcolor=#fefefe
| 489244 ||  || — || September 13, 2006 || Eskridge || Farpoint Obs. || MAS || align=right data-sort-value="0.60" | 600 m || 
|-id=245 bgcolor=#E9E9E9
| 489245 ||  || — || September 14, 2006 || Kitt Peak || Spacewatch || JUN || align=right data-sort-value="0.99" | 990 m || 
|-id=246 bgcolor=#E9E9E9
| 489246 ||  || — || September 14, 2006 || Kitt Peak || Spacewatch || — || align=right | 1.1 km || 
|-id=247 bgcolor=#E9E9E9
| 489247 ||  || — || September 14, 2006 || Kitt Peak || Spacewatch || — || align=right | 1.7 km || 
|-id=248 bgcolor=#E9E9E9
| 489248 ||  || — || August 19, 2006 || Anderson Mesa || LONEOS || — || align=right | 1.6 km || 
|-id=249 bgcolor=#E9E9E9
| 489249 ||  || — || September 14, 2006 || Kitt Peak || Spacewatch || — || align=right | 1.5 km || 
|-id=250 bgcolor=#d6d6d6
| 489250 ||  || — || September 14, 2006 || Kitt Peak || Spacewatch || — || align=right | 2.3 km || 
|-id=251 bgcolor=#FA8072
| 489251 ||  || — || September 12, 2006 || Catalina || CSS || — || align=right data-sort-value="0.47" | 470 m || 
|-id=252 bgcolor=#E9E9E9
| 489252 ||  || — || August 28, 2006 || Kitt Peak || Spacewatch || — || align=right | 1.5 km || 
|-id=253 bgcolor=#E9E9E9
| 489253 ||  || — || September 15, 2006 || Kitt Peak || Spacewatch || — || align=right | 1.2 km || 
|-id=254 bgcolor=#E9E9E9
| 489254 ||  || — || September 15, 2006 || Kitt Peak || Spacewatch || — || align=right data-sort-value="0.68" | 680 m || 
|-id=255 bgcolor=#fefefe
| 489255 ||  || — || September 15, 2006 || Kitt Peak || Spacewatch || — || align=right data-sort-value="0.57" | 570 m || 
|-id=256 bgcolor=#E9E9E9
| 489256 ||  || — || September 15, 2006 || Kitt Peak || Spacewatch || — || align=right | 1.9 km || 
|-id=257 bgcolor=#d6d6d6
| 489257 ||  || — || September 15, 2006 || Kitt Peak || Spacewatch || — || align=right | 2.7 km || 
|-id=258 bgcolor=#E9E9E9
| 489258 ||  || — || September 15, 2006 || Kitt Peak || Spacewatch || — || align=right | 1.4 km || 
|-id=259 bgcolor=#d6d6d6
| 489259 ||  || — || September 15, 2006 || Kitt Peak || Spacewatch || — || align=right | 3.5 km || 
|-id=260 bgcolor=#fefefe
| 489260 ||  || — || August 30, 2006 || Anderson Mesa || LONEOS || — || align=right data-sort-value="0.72" | 720 m || 
|-id=261 bgcolor=#E9E9E9
| 489261 ||  || — || September 14, 2006 || Mauna Kea || J. Masiero || — || align=right data-sort-value="0.63" | 630 m || 
|-id=262 bgcolor=#E9E9E9
| 489262 ||  || — || September 14, 2006 || Mauna Kea || J. Masiero || MRX || align=right data-sort-value="0.88" | 880 m || 
|-id=263 bgcolor=#E9E9E9
| 489263 ||  || — || September 14, 2006 || Palomar || NEAT || — || align=right | 1.1 km || 
|-id=264 bgcolor=#E9E9E9
| 489264 ||  || — || September 14, 2006 || Kitt Peak || Spacewatch || ADE || align=right | 1.7 km || 
|-id=265 bgcolor=#d6d6d6
| 489265 ||  || — || September 16, 2006 || Kitt Peak || Spacewatch || — || align=right | 3.3 km || 
|-id=266 bgcolor=#d6d6d6
| 489266 ||  || — || September 17, 2006 || Kitt Peak || Spacewatch || — || align=right | 2.4 km || 
|-id=267 bgcolor=#d6d6d6
| 489267 ||  || — || September 17, 2006 || Kitt Peak || Spacewatch || — || align=right | 3.9 km || 
|-id=268 bgcolor=#E9E9E9
| 489268 ||  || — || September 17, 2006 || Catalina || CSS || — || align=right data-sort-value="0.86" | 860 m || 
|-id=269 bgcolor=#E9E9E9
| 489269 ||  || — || September 17, 2006 || Kitt Peak || Spacewatch || — || align=right | 1.3 km || 
|-id=270 bgcolor=#E9E9E9
| 489270 ||  || — || September 19, 2006 || Anderson Mesa || LONEOS || — || align=right | 1.7 km || 
|-id=271 bgcolor=#E9E9E9
| 489271 ||  || — || September 20, 2006 || Kitt Peak || Spacewatch || — || align=right | 2.2 km || 
|-id=272 bgcolor=#E9E9E9
| 489272 ||  || — || September 17, 2006 || Catalina || CSS || — || align=right | 2.1 km || 
|-id=273 bgcolor=#d6d6d6
| 489273 ||  || — || September 19, 2006 || Kitt Peak || Spacewatch || THM || align=right | 1.7 km || 
|-id=274 bgcolor=#E9E9E9
| 489274 ||  || — || September 18, 2006 || Kitt Peak || Spacewatch || — || align=right | 2.3 km || 
|-id=275 bgcolor=#d6d6d6
| 489275 ||  || — || September 18, 2006 || Kitt Peak || Spacewatch || HYG || align=right | 2.5 km || 
|-id=276 bgcolor=#d6d6d6
| 489276 ||  || — || September 19, 2006 || Kitt Peak || Spacewatch || KOR || align=right data-sort-value="0.99" | 990 m || 
|-id=277 bgcolor=#d6d6d6
| 489277 ||  || — || September 19, 2006 || Kitt Peak || Spacewatch || THM || align=right | 1.8 km || 
|-id=278 bgcolor=#fefefe
| 489278 ||  || — || July 21, 2006 || Mount Lemmon || Mount Lemmon Survey || — || align=right data-sort-value="0.68" | 680 m || 
|-id=279 bgcolor=#E9E9E9
| 489279 ||  || — || September 20, 2006 || Catalina || CSS || — || align=right | 1.7 km || 
|-id=280 bgcolor=#fefefe
| 489280 ||  || — || September 19, 2006 || Kitt Peak || Spacewatch || — || align=right data-sort-value="0.55" | 550 m || 
|-id=281 bgcolor=#E9E9E9
| 489281 ||  || — || September 25, 2006 || Kitt Peak || Spacewatch || EUN || align=right data-sort-value="0.88" | 880 m || 
|-id=282 bgcolor=#E9E9E9
| 489282 ||  || — || September 17, 2006 || Kitt Peak || Spacewatch || EUN || align=right | 1.1 km || 
|-id=283 bgcolor=#fefefe
| 489283 ||  || — || September 14, 2006 || Kitt Peak || Spacewatch || — || align=right data-sort-value="0.44" | 440 m || 
|-id=284 bgcolor=#E9E9E9
| 489284 ||  || — || September 25, 2006 || Mount Lemmon || Mount Lemmon Survey || critical || align=right | 2.3 km || 
|-id=285 bgcolor=#fefefe
| 489285 ||  || — || September 25, 2006 || Kitt Peak || Spacewatch || — || align=right data-sort-value="0.62" | 620 m || 
|-id=286 bgcolor=#d6d6d6
| 489286 ||  || — || September 18, 2006 || Kitt Peak || Spacewatch || — || align=right | 2.9 km || 
|-id=287 bgcolor=#fefefe
| 489287 ||  || — || September 24, 2006 || Kitt Peak || Spacewatch || — || align=right data-sort-value="0.36" | 360 m || 
|-id=288 bgcolor=#d6d6d6
| 489288 ||  || — || September 15, 2006 || Kitt Peak || Spacewatch || — || align=right | 2.0 km || 
|-id=289 bgcolor=#d6d6d6
| 489289 ||  || — || September 25, 2006 || Kitt Peak || Spacewatch || THM || align=right | 2.8 km || 
|-id=290 bgcolor=#d6d6d6
| 489290 ||  || — || September 25, 2006 || Kitt Peak || Spacewatch || — || align=right | 2.0 km || 
|-id=291 bgcolor=#E9E9E9
| 489291 ||  || — || September 18, 2006 || Kitt Peak || Spacewatch || — || align=right | 1.5 km || 
|-id=292 bgcolor=#E9E9E9
| 489292 ||  || — || August 28, 2006 || Kitt Peak || Spacewatch || — || align=right | 1.5 km || 
|-id=293 bgcolor=#E9E9E9
| 489293 ||  || — || September 26, 2006 || Kitt Peak || Spacewatch || — || align=right data-sort-value="0.94" | 940 m || 
|-id=294 bgcolor=#E9E9E9
| 489294 ||  || — || September 18, 2006 || Kitt Peak || Spacewatch || — || align=right | 1.2 km || 
|-id=295 bgcolor=#E9E9E9
| 489295 ||  || — || September 26, 2006 || Kitt Peak || Spacewatch || — || align=right | 1.1 km || 
|-id=296 bgcolor=#E9E9E9
| 489296 ||  || — || September 26, 2006 || Mount Lemmon || Mount Lemmon Survey || AST || align=right | 1.5 km || 
|-id=297 bgcolor=#E9E9E9
| 489297 ||  || — || September 19, 2006 || Kitt Peak || Spacewatch || — || align=right | 1.6 km || 
|-id=298 bgcolor=#FA8072
| 489298 ||  || — || September 18, 2006 || Catalina || CSS || critical || align=right data-sort-value="0.59" | 590 m || 
|-id=299 bgcolor=#d6d6d6
| 489299 ||  || — || September 26, 2006 || Kitt Peak || Spacewatch || HYG || align=right | 2.5 km || 
|-id=300 bgcolor=#d6d6d6
| 489300 ||  || — || September 26, 2006 || Kitt Peak || Spacewatch || — || align=right | 2.2 km || 
|}

489301–489400 

|-bgcolor=#E9E9E9
| 489301 ||  || — || September 26, 2006 || Mount Lemmon || Mount Lemmon Survey || (5) || align=right data-sort-value="0.74" | 740 m || 
|-id=302 bgcolor=#d6d6d6
| 489302 ||  || — || September 27, 2006 || Mount Lemmon || Mount Lemmon Survey || VER || align=right | 2.7 km || 
|-id=303 bgcolor=#fefefe
| 489303 ||  || — || September 22, 2006 || Anderson Mesa || LONEOS || — || align=right data-sort-value="0.90" | 900 m || 
|-id=304 bgcolor=#E9E9E9
| 489304 ||  || — || September 17, 2006 || Kitt Peak || Spacewatch || — || align=right | 1.2 km || 
|-id=305 bgcolor=#d6d6d6
| 489305 ||  || — || September 17, 2006 || Kitt Peak || Spacewatch || — || align=right | 2.0 km || 
|-id=306 bgcolor=#E9E9E9
| 489306 ||  || — || September 17, 2006 || Kitt Peak || Spacewatch || — || align=right | 1.5 km || 
|-id=307 bgcolor=#E9E9E9
| 489307 ||  || — || September 17, 2006 || Kitt Peak || Spacewatch || — || align=right | 1.4 km || 
|-id=308 bgcolor=#E9E9E9
| 489308 ||  || — || September 27, 2006 || Kitt Peak || Spacewatch || (5) || align=right data-sort-value="0.81" | 810 m || 
|-id=309 bgcolor=#E9E9E9
| 489309 ||  || — || September 27, 2006 || Kitt Peak || Spacewatch || — || align=right | 1.3 km || 
|-id=310 bgcolor=#E9E9E9
| 489310 ||  || — || September 27, 2006 || Kitt Peak || Spacewatch || — || align=right | 2.0 km || 
|-id=311 bgcolor=#d6d6d6
| 489311 ||  || — || September 27, 2006 || Kitt Peak || Spacewatch || THM || align=right | 1.9 km || 
|-id=312 bgcolor=#fefefe
| 489312 ||  || — || September 28, 2006 || Kitt Peak || Spacewatch || V || align=right data-sort-value="0.59" | 590 m || 
|-id=313 bgcolor=#d6d6d6
| 489313 ||  || — || September 28, 2006 || Kitt Peak || Spacewatch || — || align=right | 2.6 km || 
|-id=314 bgcolor=#fefefe
| 489314 ||  || — || September 30, 2006 || Catalina || CSS || NYS || align=right data-sort-value="0.69" | 690 m || 
|-id=315 bgcolor=#fefefe
| 489315 ||  || — || September 25, 2006 || Kitt Peak || Spacewatch || — || align=right data-sort-value="0.68" | 680 m || 
|-id=316 bgcolor=#fefefe
| 489316 ||  || — || September 30, 2006 || Mount Lemmon || Mount Lemmon Survey || — || align=right data-sort-value="0.59" | 590 m || 
|-id=317 bgcolor=#E9E9E9
| 489317 ||  || — || September 25, 2006 || Kitt Peak || Spacewatch || — || align=right | 1.8 km || 
|-id=318 bgcolor=#fefefe
| 489318 ||  || — || September 27, 2006 || Mount Lemmon || Mount Lemmon Survey || MAS || align=right data-sort-value="0.57" | 570 m || 
|-id=319 bgcolor=#E9E9E9
| 489319 ||  || — || September 17, 2006 || Catalina || CSS || EUN || align=right | 2.2 km || 
|-id=320 bgcolor=#d6d6d6
| 489320 ||  || — || September 30, 2006 || Mount Lemmon || Mount Lemmon Survey || — || align=right | 3.0 km || 
|-id=321 bgcolor=#E9E9E9
| 489321 ||  || — || October 14, 2006 || Piszkéstető || K. Sárneczky, Z. Kuli || — || align=right | 2.2 km || 
|-id=322 bgcolor=#fefefe
| 489322 ||  || — || October 3, 2006 || Kitt Peak || Spacewatch || — || align=right data-sort-value="0.73" | 730 m || 
|-id=323 bgcolor=#fefefe
| 489323 ||  || — || October 11, 2006 || Kitt Peak || Spacewatch || NYS || align=right data-sort-value="0.54" | 540 m || 
|-id=324 bgcolor=#E9E9E9
| 489324 ||  || — || September 26, 2006 || Mount Lemmon || Mount Lemmon Survey || — || align=right | 1.4 km || 
|-id=325 bgcolor=#d6d6d6
| 489325 ||  || — || October 12, 2006 || Kitt Peak || Spacewatch || THM || align=right | 2.4 km || 
|-id=326 bgcolor=#fefefe
| 489326 ||  || — || October 4, 2006 || Mount Lemmon || Mount Lemmon Survey || — || align=right data-sort-value="0.77" | 770 m || 
|-id=327 bgcolor=#d6d6d6
| 489327 ||  || — || October 4, 2006 || Mount Lemmon || Mount Lemmon Survey || — || align=right | 2.1 km || 
|-id=328 bgcolor=#d6d6d6
| 489328 ||  || — || October 11, 2006 || Palomar || NEAT || LIX || align=right | 3.1 km || 
|-id=329 bgcolor=#d6d6d6
| 489329 ||  || — || September 28, 2006 || Catalina || CSS || — || align=right | 3.0 km || 
|-id=330 bgcolor=#fefefe
| 489330 ||  || — || October 11, 2006 || Palomar || NEAT || — || align=right data-sort-value="0.78" | 780 m || 
|-id=331 bgcolor=#E9E9E9
| 489331 ||  || — || October 13, 2006 || Kitt Peak || Spacewatch || — || align=right | 2.6 km || 
|-id=332 bgcolor=#d6d6d6
| 489332 ||  || — || October 13, 2006 || Kitt Peak || Spacewatch || — || align=right | 2.0 km || 
|-id=333 bgcolor=#fefefe
| 489333 ||  || — || October 12, 2006 || Kitt Peak || Spacewatch || — || align=right data-sort-value="0.65" | 650 m || 
|-id=334 bgcolor=#d6d6d6
| 489334 ||  || — || October 2, 2006 || Mount Lemmon || Mount Lemmon Survey || VER || align=right | 2.7 km || 
|-id=335 bgcolor=#E9E9E9
| 489335 ||  || — || October 15, 2006 || Kitt Peak || Spacewatch || DOR || align=right | 1.6 km || 
|-id=336 bgcolor=#fefefe
| 489336 ||  || — || October 4, 2006 || Mount Lemmon || Mount Lemmon Survey || — || align=right data-sort-value="0.69" | 690 m || 
|-id=337 bgcolor=#FFC2E0
| 489337 ||  || — || October 17, 2006 || Catalina || CSS || AMOcritical || align=right data-sort-value="0.71" | 710 m || 
|-id=338 bgcolor=#E9E9E9
| 489338 ||  || — || October 16, 2006 || Catalina || CSS || — || align=right | 2.9 km || 
|-id=339 bgcolor=#d6d6d6
| 489339 ||  || — || October 17, 2006 || Mount Lemmon || Mount Lemmon Survey || — || align=right | 2.6 km || 
|-id=340 bgcolor=#fefefe
| 489340 ||  || — || October 16, 2006 || Kitt Peak || Spacewatch || — || align=right data-sort-value="0.57" | 570 m || 
|-id=341 bgcolor=#d6d6d6
| 489341 ||  || — || October 16, 2006 || Kitt Peak || Spacewatch || — || align=right | 3.5 km || 
|-id=342 bgcolor=#fefefe
| 489342 ||  || — || October 16, 2006 || Kitt Peak || Spacewatch || — || align=right data-sort-value="0.59" | 590 m || 
|-id=343 bgcolor=#d6d6d6
| 489343 ||  || — || September 26, 2006 || Mount Lemmon || Mount Lemmon Survey || — || align=right | 2.2 km || 
|-id=344 bgcolor=#d6d6d6
| 489344 ||  || — || September 27, 2006 || Mount Lemmon || Mount Lemmon Survey || — || align=right | 2.4 km || 
|-id=345 bgcolor=#E9E9E9
| 489345 ||  || — || October 16, 2006 || Kitt Peak || Spacewatch || — || align=right | 1.9 km || 
|-id=346 bgcolor=#d6d6d6
| 489346 ||  || — || October 16, 2006 || Kitt Peak || Spacewatch || — || align=right | 2.0 km || 
|-id=347 bgcolor=#d6d6d6
| 489347 ||  || — || September 25, 2006 || Kitt Peak || Spacewatch || critical || align=right | 1.5 km || 
|-id=348 bgcolor=#fefefe
| 489348 ||  || — || October 17, 2006 || Kitt Peak || Spacewatch || Hcritical || align=right data-sort-value="0.47" | 470 m || 
|-id=349 bgcolor=#E9E9E9
| 489349 ||  || — || October 18, 2006 || Kitt Peak || Spacewatch || — || align=right | 1.7 km || 
|-id=350 bgcolor=#d6d6d6
| 489350 ||  || — || September 28, 2006 || Mount Lemmon || Mount Lemmon Survey || — || align=right | 2.0 km || 
|-id=351 bgcolor=#E9E9E9
| 489351 ||  || — || October 17, 2006 || Kitt Peak || Spacewatch || — || align=right | 1.4 km || 
|-id=352 bgcolor=#E9E9E9
| 489352 ||  || — || September 30, 2006 || Kitt Peak || Spacewatch || — || align=right | 1.2 km || 
|-id=353 bgcolor=#E9E9E9
| 489353 ||  || — || October 17, 2006 || Kitt Peak || Spacewatch || — || align=right | 1.5 km || 
|-id=354 bgcolor=#d6d6d6
| 489354 ||  || — || October 17, 2006 || Kitt Peak || Spacewatch || — || align=right | 2.6 km || 
|-id=355 bgcolor=#E9E9E9
| 489355 ||  || — || September 27, 2006 || Mount Lemmon || Mount Lemmon Survey || — || align=right | 1.8 km || 
|-id=356 bgcolor=#d6d6d6
| 489356 ||  || — || October 2, 2006 || Mount Lemmon || Mount Lemmon Survey || KOR || align=right | 1.1 km || 
|-id=357 bgcolor=#d6d6d6
| 489357 ||  || — || October 18, 2006 || Kitt Peak || Spacewatch || — || align=right | 2.7 km || 
|-id=358 bgcolor=#d6d6d6
| 489358 ||  || — || October 19, 2006 || Kitt Peak || Spacewatch || — || align=right | 2.9 km || 
|-id=359 bgcolor=#E9E9E9
| 489359 ||  || — || September 30, 2006 || Mount Lemmon || Mount Lemmon Survey || — || align=right | 1.5 km || 
|-id=360 bgcolor=#d6d6d6
| 489360 ||  || — || October 19, 2006 || Kitt Peak || Spacewatch || — || align=right | 1.7 km || 
|-id=361 bgcolor=#E9E9E9
| 489361 ||  || — || October 19, 2006 || Mount Lemmon || Mount Lemmon Survey || — || align=right | 1.1 km || 
|-id=362 bgcolor=#E9E9E9
| 489362 ||  || — || September 17, 2006 || Catalina || CSS || — || align=right | 1.0 km || 
|-id=363 bgcolor=#d6d6d6
| 489363 ||  || — || October 21, 2006 || Mount Lemmon || Mount Lemmon Survey || KOR || align=right | 1.4 km || 
|-id=364 bgcolor=#E9E9E9
| 489364 ||  || — || October 3, 2006 || Mount Lemmon || Mount Lemmon Survey || — || align=right | 1.7 km || 
|-id=365 bgcolor=#E9E9E9
| 489365 ||  || — || October 21, 2006 || Mount Lemmon || Mount Lemmon Survey || — || align=right | 1.5 km || 
|-id=366 bgcolor=#d6d6d6
| 489366 ||  || — || September 27, 2006 || Kitt Peak || Spacewatch || — || align=right | 2.4 km || 
|-id=367 bgcolor=#E9E9E9
| 489367 ||  || — || October 16, 2006 || Catalina || CSS || — || align=right | 2.1 km || 
|-id=368 bgcolor=#d6d6d6
| 489368 ||  || — || October 19, 2006 || Catalina || CSS || — || align=right | 3.4 km || 
|-id=369 bgcolor=#d6d6d6
| 489369 ||  || — || September 28, 2006 || Kitt Peak || Spacewatch || — || align=right | 3.5 km || 
|-id=370 bgcolor=#fefefe
| 489370 ||  || — || October 20, 2006 || Kitt Peak || Spacewatch || — || align=right data-sort-value="0.50" | 500 m || 
|-id=371 bgcolor=#E9E9E9
| 489371 ||  || — || October 17, 2006 || Mount Lemmon || Mount Lemmon Survey || — || align=right | 1.7 km || 
|-id=372 bgcolor=#d6d6d6
| 489372 ||  || — || October 23, 2006 || Kitt Peak || Spacewatch || — || align=right | 2.0 km || 
|-id=373 bgcolor=#fefefe
| 489373 ||  || — || October 23, 2006 || Kitt Peak || Spacewatch || — || align=right data-sort-value="0.85" | 850 m || 
|-id=374 bgcolor=#E9E9E9
| 489374 ||  || — || October 13, 2006 || Kitt Peak || Spacewatch || GEF || align=right data-sort-value="0.98" | 980 m || 
|-id=375 bgcolor=#d6d6d6
| 489375 ||  || — || October 23, 2006 || Kitt Peak || Spacewatch || — || align=right | 3.2 km || 
|-id=376 bgcolor=#E9E9E9
| 489376 ||  || — || October 4, 2006 || Mount Lemmon || Mount Lemmon Survey || — || align=right | 1.5 km || 
|-id=377 bgcolor=#E9E9E9
| 489377 ||  || — || September 30, 2006 || Catalina || CSS || EUN || align=right | 1.1 km || 
|-id=378 bgcolor=#E9E9E9
| 489378 ||  || — || October 21, 2006 || Mount Lemmon || Mount Lemmon Survey || — || align=right data-sort-value="0.94" | 940 m || 
|-id=379 bgcolor=#E9E9E9
| 489379 ||  || — || October 23, 2006 || Kitt Peak || Spacewatch || — || align=right | 1.6 km || 
|-id=380 bgcolor=#E9E9E9
| 489380 ||  || — || September 26, 2006 || Mount Lemmon || Mount Lemmon Survey || NEM || align=right | 1.9 km || 
|-id=381 bgcolor=#E9E9E9
| 489381 ||  || — || September 25, 2006 || Kitt Peak || Spacewatch || — || align=right | 1.1 km || 
|-id=382 bgcolor=#E9E9E9
| 489382 ||  || — || October 28, 2006 || Mount Lemmon || Mount Lemmon Survey || — || align=right data-sort-value="0.90" | 900 m || 
|-id=383 bgcolor=#d6d6d6
| 489383 ||  || — || October 28, 2006 || Mount Lemmon || Mount Lemmon Survey || — || align=right | 2.2 km || 
|-id=384 bgcolor=#E9E9E9
| 489384 ||  || — || October 28, 2006 || Mount Lemmon || Mount Lemmon Survey ||  || align=right | 1.5 km || 
|-id=385 bgcolor=#fefefe
| 489385 ||  || — || October 16, 2006 || Kitt Peak || Spacewatch || — || align=right data-sort-value="0.76" | 760 m || 
|-id=386 bgcolor=#d6d6d6
| 489386 ||  || — || October 19, 2006 || Kitt Peak || Spacewatch || — || align=right | 2.4 km || 
|-id=387 bgcolor=#fefefe
| 489387 ||  || — || September 28, 2006 || Mount Lemmon || Mount Lemmon Survey || — || align=right data-sort-value="0.49" | 490 m || 
|-id=388 bgcolor=#d6d6d6
| 489388 ||  || — || September 27, 2006 || Mount Lemmon || Mount Lemmon Survey || — || align=right | 2.8 km || 
|-id=389 bgcolor=#E9E9E9
| 489389 ||  || — || October 28, 2006 || Mount Lemmon || Mount Lemmon Survey || — || align=right | 2.2 km || 
|-id=390 bgcolor=#d6d6d6
| 489390 ||  || — || September 28, 2006 || Mount Lemmon || Mount Lemmon Survey || EOS || align=right | 1.6 km || 
|-id=391 bgcolor=#E9E9E9
| 489391 ||  || — || October 16, 2006 || Kitt Peak || Spacewatch || — || align=right | 1.2 km || 
|-id=392 bgcolor=#fefefe
| 489392 ||  || — || October 18, 2006 || Kitt Peak || Spacewatch || — || align=right data-sort-value="0.48" | 480 m || 
|-id=393 bgcolor=#fefefe
| 489393 ||  || — || October 19, 2006 || Kitt Peak || Spacewatch || V || align=right data-sort-value="0.41" | 410 m || 
|-id=394 bgcolor=#E9E9E9
| 489394 ||  || — || October 19, 2006 || Mount Lemmon || Mount Lemmon Survey || — || align=right | 2.4 km || 
|-id=395 bgcolor=#d6d6d6
| 489395 ||  || — || October 16, 2006 || Catalina || CSS || — || align=right | 3.6 km || 
|-id=396 bgcolor=#d6d6d6
| 489396 ||  || — || October 16, 2006 || Kitt Peak || Spacewatch || — || align=right | 2.2 km || 
|-id=397 bgcolor=#E9E9E9
| 489397 ||  || — || October 2, 2006 || Mount Lemmon || Mount Lemmon Survey || — || align=right | 1.1 km || 
|-id=398 bgcolor=#FA8072
| 489398 ||  || — || October 23, 2006 || Catalina || CSS || — || align=right data-sort-value="0.62" | 620 m || 
|-id=399 bgcolor=#fefefe
| 489399 ||  || — || October 2, 2006 || Mount Lemmon || Mount Lemmon Survey || — || align=right data-sort-value="0.47" | 470 m || 
|-id=400 bgcolor=#d6d6d6
| 489400 ||  || — || November 10, 2006 || Kitt Peak || Spacewatch || — || align=right | 2.2 km || 
|}

489401–489500 

|-bgcolor=#d6d6d6
| 489401 ||  || — || November 11, 2006 || Kitt Peak || Spacewatch || THM || align=right | 1.8 km || 
|-id=402 bgcolor=#d6d6d6
| 489402 ||  || — || October 22, 2006 || Kitt Peak || Spacewatch || — || align=right | 2.7 km || 
|-id=403 bgcolor=#fefefe
| 489403 ||  || — || September 30, 2006 || Mount Lemmon || Mount Lemmon Survey || — || align=right data-sort-value="0.59" | 590 m || 
|-id=404 bgcolor=#E9E9E9
| 489404 ||  || — || November 9, 2006 || Kitt Peak || Spacewatch || — || align=right | 2.4 km || 
|-id=405 bgcolor=#fefefe
| 489405 ||  || — || October 31, 2006 || Mount Lemmon || Mount Lemmon Survey || ERI || align=right | 1.4 km || 
|-id=406 bgcolor=#d6d6d6
| 489406 ||  || — || November 10, 2006 || Kitt Peak || Spacewatch || — || align=right | 2.4 km || 
|-id=407 bgcolor=#E9E9E9
| 489407 ||  || — || November 10, 2006 || Kitt Peak || Spacewatch || — || align=right | 1.3 km || 
|-id=408 bgcolor=#E9E9E9
| 489408 ||  || — || October 17, 2006 || Mount Lemmon || Mount Lemmon Survey || — || align=right | 2.2 km || 
|-id=409 bgcolor=#d6d6d6
| 489409 ||  || — || October 12, 2006 || Kitt Peak || Spacewatch || 7:4 || align=right | 2.6 km || 
|-id=410 bgcolor=#E9E9E9
| 489410 ||  || — || October 22, 2006 || Mount Lemmon || Mount Lemmon Survey || — || align=right | 1.7 km || 
|-id=411 bgcolor=#E9E9E9
| 489411 ||  || — || October 16, 2006 || Kitt Peak || Spacewatch || — || align=right | 1.6 km || 
|-id=412 bgcolor=#d6d6d6
| 489412 ||  || — || October 28, 2006 || Mount Lemmon || Mount Lemmon Survey || — || align=right | 1.8 km || 
|-id=413 bgcolor=#fefefe
| 489413 ||  || — || September 27, 2006 || Mount Lemmon || Mount Lemmon Survey || — || align=right data-sort-value="0.71" | 710 m || 
|-id=414 bgcolor=#E9E9E9
| 489414 ||  || — || November 11, 2006 || Kitt Peak || Spacewatch || — || align=right | 1.8 km || 
|-id=415 bgcolor=#E9E9E9
| 489415 ||  || — || November 11, 2006 || Kitt Peak || Spacewatch || — || align=right | 2.5 km || 
|-id=416 bgcolor=#E9E9E9
| 489416 ||  || — || October 28, 2006 || Mount Lemmon || Mount Lemmon Survey || — || align=right data-sort-value="0.87" | 870 m || 
|-id=417 bgcolor=#E9E9E9
| 489417 ||  || — || November 12, 2006 || Mount Lemmon || Mount Lemmon Survey || — || align=right | 1.4 km || 
|-id=418 bgcolor=#d6d6d6
| 489418 ||  || — || October 19, 2006 || Mount Lemmon || Mount Lemmon Survey || — || align=right | 1.6 km || 
|-id=419 bgcolor=#E9E9E9
| 489419 ||  || — || October 29, 2006 || Mount Lemmon || Mount Lemmon Survey || EUN || align=right | 1.0 km || 
|-id=420 bgcolor=#fefefe
| 489420 ||  || — || November 13, 2006 || Kitt Peak || Spacewatch || — || align=right data-sort-value="0.64" | 640 m || 
|-id=421 bgcolor=#d6d6d6
| 489421 ||  || — || October 27, 2006 || Catalina || CSS || — || align=right | 2.3 km || 
|-id=422 bgcolor=#E9E9E9
| 489422 ||  || — || November 14, 2006 || Catalina || CSS || — || align=right | 2.2 km || 
|-id=423 bgcolor=#E9E9E9
| 489423 ||  || — || November 15, 2006 || Kitt Peak || Spacewatch || ADE || align=right | 1.8 km || 
|-id=424 bgcolor=#d6d6d6
| 489424 ||  || — || November 15, 2006 || Kitt Peak || Spacewatch || critical || align=right | 1.9 km || 
|-id=425 bgcolor=#fefefe
| 489425 ||  || — || September 28, 2006 || Mount Lemmon || Mount Lemmon Survey || — || align=right data-sort-value="0.68" | 680 m || 
|-id=426 bgcolor=#d6d6d6
| 489426 ||  || — || November 1, 2006 || Mount Lemmon || Mount Lemmon Survey || — || align=right | 3.0 km || 
|-id=427 bgcolor=#fefefe
| 489427 ||  || — || November 15, 2006 || Kitt Peak || Spacewatch || — || align=right data-sort-value="0.61" | 610 m || 
|-id=428 bgcolor=#E9E9E9
| 489428 ||  || — || November 13, 2006 || Catalina || CSS || — || align=right | 2.1 km || 
|-id=429 bgcolor=#FA8072
| 489429 ||  || — || November 16, 2006 || Nyukasa || Mount Nyukasa Stn. || — || align=right data-sort-value="0.65" | 650 m || 
|-id=430 bgcolor=#E9E9E9
| 489430 ||  || — || November 16, 2006 || Mount Lemmon || Mount Lemmon Survey || — || align=right | 1.3 km || 
|-id=431 bgcolor=#E9E9E9
| 489431 ||  || — || November 16, 2006 || Kitt Peak || Spacewatch || — || align=right | 2.0 km || 
|-id=432 bgcolor=#E9E9E9
| 489432 ||  || — || November 16, 2006 || Mount Lemmon || Mount Lemmon Survey || — || align=right | 1.8 km || 
|-id=433 bgcolor=#E9E9E9
| 489433 ||  || — || November 16, 2006 || Catalina || CSS || — || align=right | 1.8 km || 
|-id=434 bgcolor=#fefefe
| 489434 ||  || — || November 18, 2006 || Kitt Peak || Spacewatch || NYS || align=right data-sort-value="0.59" | 590 m || 
|-id=435 bgcolor=#d6d6d6
| 489435 ||  || — || October 21, 2006 || Kitt Peak || Spacewatch || — || align=right | 1.8 km || 
|-id=436 bgcolor=#E9E9E9
| 489436 ||  || — || November 18, 2006 || Kitt Peak || Spacewatch || — || align=right | 2.1 km || 
|-id=437 bgcolor=#fefefe
| 489437 ||  || — || November 19, 2006 || Kitt Peak || Spacewatch || MAS || align=right data-sort-value="0.58" | 580 m || 
|-id=438 bgcolor=#E9E9E9
| 489438 ||  || — || November 19, 2006 || Kitt Peak || Spacewatch || — || align=right | 1.9 km || 
|-id=439 bgcolor=#E9E9E9
| 489439 ||  || — || November 19, 2006 || Kitt Peak || Spacewatch || DOR || align=right | 1.8 km || 
|-id=440 bgcolor=#fefefe
| 489440 ||  || — || November 27, 2006 || Kitt Peak || Spacewatch || — || align=right data-sort-value="0.62" | 620 m || 
|-id=441 bgcolor=#fefefe
| 489441 ||  || — || November 21, 2006 || Mount Lemmon || Mount Lemmon Survey || MAS || align=right data-sort-value="0.70" | 700 m || 
|-id=442 bgcolor=#E9E9E9
| 489442 ||  || — || November 10, 2006 || Kitt Peak || Spacewatch || — || align=right | 1.8 km || 
|-id=443 bgcolor=#E9E9E9
| 489443 ||  || — || December 11, 2006 || Kitt Peak || Spacewatch || — || align=right | 2.2 km || 
|-id=444 bgcolor=#E9E9E9
| 489444 ||  || — || December 15, 2006 || Kitt Peak || Spacewatch || — || align=right | 2.3 km || 
|-id=445 bgcolor=#E9E9E9
| 489445 ||  || — || October 3, 2006 || Mount Lemmon || Mount Lemmon Survey || — || align=right | 2.1 km || 
|-id=446 bgcolor=#d6d6d6
| 489446 ||  || — || November 11, 2006 || Kitt Peak || Spacewatch || — || align=right | 3.0 km || 
|-id=447 bgcolor=#fefefe
| 489447 ||  || — || December 21, 2006 || Kitt Peak || Spacewatch || — || align=right data-sort-value="0.49" | 490 m || 
|-id=448 bgcolor=#fefefe
| 489448 ||  || — || December 24, 2006 || Kitt Peak || Spacewatch || — || align=right data-sort-value="0.86" | 860 m || 
|-id=449 bgcolor=#E9E9E9
| 489449 ||  || — || December 21, 2006 || Kitt Peak || Spacewatch || — || align=right | 1.8 km || 
|-id=450 bgcolor=#d6d6d6
| 489450 ||  || — || November 22, 2006 || Mount Lemmon || Mount Lemmon Survey || THB || align=right | 2.7 km || 
|-id=451 bgcolor=#fefefe
| 489451 ||  || — || January 10, 2007 || Kitt Peak || Spacewatch || — || align=right data-sort-value="0.62" | 620 m || 
|-id=452 bgcolor=#E9E9E9
| 489452 ||  || — || November 28, 2006 || Mount Lemmon || Mount Lemmon Survey || — || align=right | 1.8 km || 
|-id=453 bgcolor=#FFC2E0
| 489453 ||  || — || January 24, 2007 || Mount Lemmon || Mount Lemmon Survey || APO || align=right data-sort-value="0.36" | 360 m || 
|-id=454 bgcolor=#E9E9E9
| 489454 ||  || — || December 13, 2006 || Mount Lemmon || Mount Lemmon Survey || — || align=right | 2.2 km || 
|-id=455 bgcolor=#fefefe
| 489455 ||  || — || January 26, 2007 || Kitt Peak || Spacewatch || — || align=right data-sort-value="0.64" | 640 m || 
|-id=456 bgcolor=#E9E9E9
| 489456 ||  || — || January 27, 2007 || Kitt Peak || Spacewatch || — || align=right | 1.7 km || 
|-id=457 bgcolor=#E9E9E9
| 489457 ||  || — || November 27, 2006 || Mount Lemmon || Mount Lemmon Survey || — || align=right | 1.7 km || 
|-id=458 bgcolor=#E9E9E9
| 489458 ||  || — || January 28, 2007 || Mount Lemmon || Mount Lemmon Survey || DOR || align=right | 2.4 km || 
|-id=459 bgcolor=#E9E9E9
| 489459 ||  || — || November 18, 2006 || Mount Lemmon || Mount Lemmon Survey || — || align=right | 2.0 km || 
|-id=460 bgcolor=#E9E9E9
| 489460 ||  || — || February 6, 2007 || Mount Lemmon || Mount Lemmon Survey || — || align=right | 1.7 km || 
|-id=461 bgcolor=#E9E9E9
| 489461 ||  || — || February 10, 2007 || Mount Lemmon || Mount Lemmon Survey || — || align=right | 1.1 km || 
|-id=462 bgcolor=#E9E9E9
| 489462 ||  || — || September 29, 2005 || Mount Lemmon || Mount Lemmon Survey || — || align=right data-sort-value="0.65" | 650 m || 
|-id=463 bgcolor=#fefefe
| 489463 ||  || — || February 17, 2007 || Kitt Peak || Spacewatch || — || align=right data-sort-value="0.63" | 630 m || 
|-id=464 bgcolor=#d6d6d6
| 489464 ||  || — || February 17, 2007 || Kitt Peak || Spacewatch || — || align=right | 2.0 km || 
|-id=465 bgcolor=#d6d6d6
| 489465 ||  || — || February 17, 2007 || Kitt Peak || Spacewatch || — || align=right | 2.5 km || 
|-id=466 bgcolor=#fefefe
| 489466 ||  || — || February 17, 2007 || Kitt Peak || Spacewatch || — || align=right data-sort-value="0.62" | 620 m || 
|-id=467 bgcolor=#fefefe
| 489467 ||  || — || February 17, 2007 || Kitt Peak || Spacewatch || — || align=right data-sort-value="0.62" | 620 m || 
|-id=468 bgcolor=#fefefe
| 489468 ||  || — || February 21, 2007 || Kitt Peak || Spacewatch || — || align=right data-sort-value="0.62" | 620 m || 
|-id=469 bgcolor=#fefefe
| 489469 ||  || — || February 21, 2007 || Kitt Peak || Spacewatch || — || align=right data-sort-value="0.65" | 650 m || 
|-id=470 bgcolor=#fefefe
| 489470 ||  || — || February 21, 2007 || Kitt Peak || Spacewatch || — || align=right data-sort-value="0.58" | 580 m || 
|-id=471 bgcolor=#fefefe
| 489471 ||  || — || February 21, 2007 || Kitt Peak || Spacewatch || NYS || align=right data-sort-value="0.55" | 550 m || 
|-id=472 bgcolor=#d6d6d6
| 489472 ||  || — || November 24, 2006 || Mount Lemmon || Mount Lemmon Survey || — || align=right | 2.5 km || 
|-id=473 bgcolor=#d6d6d6
| 489473 ||  || — || February 23, 2007 || Kitt Peak || Spacewatch || BRA || align=right | 1.4 km || 
|-id=474 bgcolor=#fefefe
| 489474 ||  || — || February 17, 2007 || Kitt Peak || Spacewatch || — || align=right data-sort-value="0.58" | 580 m || 
|-id=475 bgcolor=#d6d6d6
| 489475 ||  || — || March 9, 2007 || Mount Lemmon || Mount Lemmon Survey || — || align=right | 2.5 km || 
|-id=476 bgcolor=#d6d6d6
| 489476 ||  || — || December 21, 2006 || Mount Lemmon || Mount Lemmon Survey || BRA || align=right | 1.9 km || 
|-id=477 bgcolor=#fefefe
| 489477 ||  || — || March 9, 2007 || Mount Lemmon || Mount Lemmon Survey || — || align=right data-sort-value="0.65" | 650 m || 
|-id=478 bgcolor=#d6d6d6
| 489478 ||  || — || March 9, 2007 || Kitt Peak || Spacewatch || BRA || align=right | 1.5 km || 
|-id=479 bgcolor=#E9E9E9
| 489479 ||  || — || March 10, 2007 || Mount Lemmon || Mount Lemmon Survey || — || align=right | 1.1 km || 
|-id=480 bgcolor=#fefefe
| 489480 ||  || — || March 12, 2007 || Mount Lemmon || Mount Lemmon Survey || — || align=right data-sort-value="0.53" | 530 m || 
|-id=481 bgcolor=#E9E9E9
| 489481 ||  || — || January 29, 2007 || Kitt Peak || Spacewatch || — || align=right | 1.7 km || 
|-id=482 bgcolor=#fefefe
| 489482 ||  || — || January 27, 2007 || Kitt Peak || Spacewatch || — || align=right data-sort-value="0.62" | 620 m || 
|-id=483 bgcolor=#d6d6d6
| 489483 ||  || — || February 23, 2007 || Mount Lemmon || Mount Lemmon Survey || — || align=right | 2.5 km || 
|-id=484 bgcolor=#d6d6d6
| 489484 ||  || — || March 14, 2007 || Kitt Peak || Spacewatch || — || align=right | 2.2 km || 
|-id=485 bgcolor=#d6d6d6
| 489485 ||  || — || March 15, 2007 || Kitt Peak || Spacewatch || — || align=right | 2.1 km || 
|-id=486 bgcolor=#FFC2E0
| 489486 ||  || — || April 11, 2007 || Siding Spring || SSS || APOPHAmoon || align=right data-sort-value="0.46" | 460 m || 
|-id=487 bgcolor=#d6d6d6
| 489487 ||  || — || March 13, 2007 || Mount Lemmon || Mount Lemmon Survey || EMA || align=right | 2.6 km || 
|-id=488 bgcolor=#fefefe
| 489488 ||  || — || April 14, 2007 || Kitt Peak || Spacewatch || — || align=right data-sort-value="0.53" | 530 m || 
|-id=489 bgcolor=#d6d6d6
| 489489 ||  || — || April 15, 2007 || Kitt Peak || Spacewatch || — || align=right | 2.0 km || 
|-id=490 bgcolor=#d6d6d6
| 489490 ||  || — || April 15, 2007 || Kitt Peak || Spacewatch || — || align=right | 3.0 km || 
|-id=491 bgcolor=#fefefe
| 489491 ||  || — || April 11, 2007 || Mount Lemmon || Mount Lemmon Survey || — || align=right data-sort-value="0.50" | 500 m || 
|-id=492 bgcolor=#fefefe
| 489492 ||  || — || April 11, 2007 || Kitt Peak || Spacewatch || — || align=right data-sort-value="0.59" | 590 m || 
|-id=493 bgcolor=#fefefe
| 489493 ||  || — || April 18, 2007 || Kitt Peak || Spacewatch || — || align=right data-sort-value="0.50" | 500 m || 
|-id=494 bgcolor=#fefefe
| 489494 ||  || — || November 26, 2005 || Mount Lemmon || Mount Lemmon Survey || — || align=right data-sort-value="0.59" | 590 m || 
|-id=495 bgcolor=#E9E9E9
| 489495 ||  || — || May 9, 2007 || Mount Lemmon || Mount Lemmon Survey || — || align=right | 1.1 km || 
|-id=496 bgcolor=#fefefe
| 489496 ||  || — || May 9, 2007 || Mount Lemmon || Mount Lemmon Survey || — || align=right data-sort-value="0.65" | 650 m || 
|-id=497 bgcolor=#d6d6d6
| 489497 ||  || — || May 10, 2007 || Mount Lemmon || Mount Lemmon Survey || — || align=right | 2.5 km || 
|-id=498 bgcolor=#fefefe
| 489498 ||  || — || April 22, 2007 || Mount Lemmon || Mount Lemmon Survey || — || align=right data-sort-value="0.63" | 630 m || 
|-id=499 bgcolor=#d6d6d6
| 489499 ||  || — || April 25, 2007 || Mount Lemmon || Mount Lemmon Survey || — || align=right | 2.8 km || 
|-id=500 bgcolor=#fefefe
| 489500 ||  || — || May 11, 2007 || Mount Lemmon || Mount Lemmon Survey || — || align=right data-sort-value="0.83" | 830 m || 
|}

489501–489600 

|-bgcolor=#fefefe
| 489501 ||  || — || May 26, 2007 || Mount Lemmon || Mount Lemmon Survey || — || align=right data-sort-value="0.53" | 530 m || 
|-id=502 bgcolor=#d6d6d6
| 489502 ||  || — || June 13, 2007 || Kitt Peak || Spacewatch || — || align=right | 2.5 km || 
|-id=503 bgcolor=#d6d6d6
| 489503 ||  || — || June 15, 2007 || Kitt Peak || Spacewatch || EOS || align=right | 1.7 km || 
|-id=504 bgcolor=#fefefe
| 489504 ||  || — || April 25, 2007 || Kitt Peak || Spacewatch || H || align=right data-sort-value="0.62" | 620 m || 
|-id=505 bgcolor=#fefefe
| 489505 ||  || — || June 8, 2007 || Kitt Peak || Spacewatch || H || align=right data-sort-value="0.68" | 680 m || 
|-id=506 bgcolor=#FA8072
| 489506 ||  || — || June 26, 2007 || Catalina || CSS || H || align=right data-sort-value="0.74" | 740 m || 
|-id=507 bgcolor=#fefefe
| 489507 ||  || — || July 10, 2007 || Siding Spring || SSS || — || align=right | 1.0 km || 
|-id=508 bgcolor=#FA8072
| 489508 ||  || — || July 19, 2007 || Siding Spring || SSS || — || align=right data-sort-value="0.52" | 520 m || 
|-id=509 bgcolor=#E9E9E9
| 489509 ||  || — || August 5, 2007 || Altschwendt || W. Ries || ADE || align=right | 1.4 km || 
|-id=510 bgcolor=#FA8072
| 489510 ||  || — || August 8, 2007 || Socorro || LINEAR || — || align=right | 1.4 km || 
|-id=511 bgcolor=#fefefe
| 489511 ||  || — || August 9, 2007 || Socorro || LINEAR || H || align=right data-sort-value="0.63" | 630 m || 
|-id=512 bgcolor=#FA8072
| 489512 ||  || — || August 11, 2007 || Socorro || LINEAR || — || align=right data-sort-value="0.77" | 770 m || 
|-id=513 bgcolor=#fefefe
| 489513 ||  || — || July 19, 2007 || Socorro || LINEAR || — || align=right | 1.1 km || 
|-id=514 bgcolor=#fefefe
| 489514 ||  || — || August 9, 2007 || Kitt Peak || Spacewatch || — || align=right data-sort-value="0.66" | 660 m || 
|-id=515 bgcolor=#fefefe
| 489515 ||  || — || August 8, 2007 || Socorro || LINEAR || V || align=right data-sort-value="0.74" | 740 m || 
|-id=516 bgcolor=#d6d6d6
| 489516 ||  || — || August 10, 2007 || Kitt Peak || Spacewatch || — || align=right | 2.6 km || 
|-id=517 bgcolor=#d6d6d6
| 489517 ||  || — || August 12, 2007 || Socorro || LINEAR || — || align=right | 2.9 km || 
|-id=518 bgcolor=#fefefe
| 489518 ||  || — || August 21, 2007 || Anderson Mesa || LONEOS || MAS || align=right data-sort-value="0.64" | 640 m || 
|-id=519 bgcolor=#fefefe
| 489519 ||  || — || August 9, 2007 || Kitt Peak || Spacewatch || — || align=right data-sort-value="0.68" | 680 m || 
|-id=520 bgcolor=#fefefe
| 489520 ||  || — || August 12, 2007 || Socorro || LINEAR || — || align=right data-sort-value="0.99" | 990 m || 
|-id=521 bgcolor=#E9E9E9
| 489521 ||  || — || September 4, 2007 || Mount Lemmon || Mount Lemmon Survey || AGN || align=right | 1.1 km || 
|-id=522 bgcolor=#d6d6d6
| 489522 ||  || — || September 5, 2007 || Catalina || CSS || — || align=right | 1.9 km || 
|-id=523 bgcolor=#fefefe
| 489523 ||  || — || September 9, 2007 || Kitt Peak || Spacewatch || V || align=right data-sort-value="0.53" | 530 m || 
|-id=524 bgcolor=#d6d6d6
| 489524 ||  || — || September 9, 2007 || Kitt Peak || Spacewatch || — || align=right | 3.7 km || 
|-id=525 bgcolor=#E9E9E9
| 489525 ||  || — || September 9, 2007 || Kitt Peak || Spacewatch || — || align=right | 1.4 km || 
|-id=526 bgcolor=#fefefe
| 489526 ||  || — || September 9, 2007 || Kitt Peak || Spacewatch || — || align=right data-sort-value="0.84" | 840 m || 
|-id=527 bgcolor=#E9E9E9
| 489527 ||  || — || September 9, 2007 || Kitt Peak || Spacewatch || — || align=right data-sort-value="0.78" | 780 m || 
|-id=528 bgcolor=#E9E9E9
| 489528 ||  || — || September 10, 2007 || Mount Lemmon || Mount Lemmon Survey || (5) || align=right data-sort-value="0.54" | 540 m || 
|-id=529 bgcolor=#fefefe
| 489529 ||  || — || September 10, 2007 || Kitt Peak || Spacewatch || — || align=right data-sort-value="0.60" | 600 m || 
|-id=530 bgcolor=#E9E9E9
| 489530 ||  || — || September 10, 2007 || Mount Lemmon || Mount Lemmon Survey || — || align=right | 1.5 km || 
|-id=531 bgcolor=#E9E9E9
| 489531 ||  || — || September 10, 2007 || Catalina || CSS || — || align=right | 1.5 km || 
|-id=532 bgcolor=#FA8072
| 489532 ||  || — || September 12, 2007 || Mount Lemmon || Mount Lemmon Survey || critical || align=right data-sort-value="0.52" | 520 m || 
|-id=533 bgcolor=#fefefe
| 489533 ||  || — || September 12, 2007 || Mount Lemmon || Mount Lemmon Survey || — || align=right data-sort-value="0.83" | 830 m || 
|-id=534 bgcolor=#d6d6d6
| 489534 ||  || — || September 5, 2007 || Catalina || CSS || — || align=right | 3.2 km || 
|-id=535 bgcolor=#C2FFFF
| 489535 ||  || — || September 10, 2007 || Kitt Peak || Spacewatch || L4 || align=right | 7.7 km || 
|-id=536 bgcolor=#fefefe
| 489536 ||  || — || August 10, 2007 || Kitt Peak || Spacewatch || — || align=right data-sort-value="0.82" | 820 m || 
|-id=537 bgcolor=#E9E9E9
| 489537 ||  || — || September 10, 2007 || Kitt Peak || Spacewatch || AGN || align=right data-sort-value="0.85" | 850 m || 
|-id=538 bgcolor=#d6d6d6
| 489538 ||  || — || September 10, 2007 || Kitt Peak || Spacewatch || — || align=right | 2.2 km || 
|-id=539 bgcolor=#d6d6d6
| 489539 ||  || — || September 10, 2007 || Kitt Peak || Spacewatch || — || align=right | 2.7 km || 
|-id=540 bgcolor=#d6d6d6
| 489540 ||  || — || September 10, 2007 || Kitt Peak || Spacewatch || 7:4 || align=right | 2.6 km || 
|-id=541 bgcolor=#FA8072
| 489541 ||  || — || September 9, 2007 || Kitt Peak || Spacewatch || — || align=right | 1.7 km || 
|-id=542 bgcolor=#E9E9E9
| 489542 ||  || — || September 14, 2007 || Mount Lemmon || Mount Lemmon Survey || — || align=right | 2.3 km || 
|-id=543 bgcolor=#d6d6d6
| 489543 ||  || — || September 14, 2007 || Mount Lemmon || Mount Lemmon Survey || — || align=right | 2.8 km || 
|-id=544 bgcolor=#E9E9E9
| 489544 ||  || — || September 12, 2007 || Mount Lemmon || Mount Lemmon Survey || — || align=right | 1.2 km || 
|-id=545 bgcolor=#fefefe
| 489545 ||  || — || September 5, 2007 || Catalina || CSS || — || align=right data-sort-value="0.90" | 900 m || 
|-id=546 bgcolor=#d6d6d6
| 489546 ||  || — || September 14, 2007 || Mount Lemmon || Mount Lemmon Survey || — || align=right | 2.1 km || 
|-id=547 bgcolor=#d6d6d6
| 489547 ||  || — || August 10, 2007 || Kitt Peak || Spacewatch || — || align=right | 2.3 km || 
|-id=548 bgcolor=#fefefe
| 489548 ||  || — || September 15, 2007 || Kitt Peak || Spacewatch || — || align=right data-sort-value="0.94" | 940 m || 
|-id=549 bgcolor=#fefefe
| 489549 ||  || — || September 4, 2007 || Mount Lemmon || Mount Lemmon Survey || V || align=right data-sort-value="0.70" | 700 m || 
|-id=550 bgcolor=#d6d6d6
| 489550 ||  || — || September 14, 2007 || Mount Lemmon || Mount Lemmon Survey || — || align=right | 2.1 km || 
|-id=551 bgcolor=#d6d6d6
| 489551 ||  || — || September 14, 2007 || Mount Lemmon || Mount Lemmon Survey || — || align=right | 2.3 km || 
|-id=552 bgcolor=#fefefe
| 489552 ||  || — || September 12, 2007 || Mount Lemmon || Mount Lemmon Survey || — || align=right data-sort-value="0.64" | 640 m || 
|-id=553 bgcolor=#d6d6d6
| 489553 ||  || — || September 10, 2007 || Kitt Peak || Spacewatch || — || align=right | 2.2 km || 
|-id=554 bgcolor=#fefefe
| 489554 ||  || — || September 12, 2007 || Anderson Mesa || LONEOS || — || align=right data-sort-value="0.68" | 680 m || 
|-id=555 bgcolor=#FA8072
| 489555 ||  || — || September 13, 2007 || Catalina || CSS || H || align=right data-sort-value="0.70" | 700 m || 
|-id=556 bgcolor=#fefefe
| 489556 ||  || — || September 9, 2007 || Mount Lemmon || Mount Lemmon Survey || — || align=right data-sort-value="0.75" | 750 m || 
|-id=557 bgcolor=#E9E9E9
| 489557 ||  || — || September 25, 2007 || Mount Lemmon || Mount Lemmon Survey || — || align=right | 1.8 km || 
|-id=558 bgcolor=#fefefe
| 489558 ||  || — || September 20, 2007 || Catalina || CSS || — || align=right data-sort-value="0.98" | 980 m || 
|-id=559 bgcolor=#d6d6d6
| 489559 ||  || — || October 2, 2007 || Majdanak || Majdanak Obs. || — || align=right | 1.9 km || 
|-id=560 bgcolor=#E9E9E9
| 489560 ||  || — || October 6, 2007 || Socorro || LINEAR || — || align=right | 2.1 km || 
|-id=561 bgcolor=#d6d6d6
| 489561 ||  || — || October 4, 2007 || Kitt Peak || Spacewatch || — || align=right | 2.1 km || 
|-id=562 bgcolor=#fefefe
| 489562 ||  || — || October 4, 2007 || Catalina || CSS || NYS || align=right data-sort-value="0.66" | 660 m || 
|-id=563 bgcolor=#fefefe
| 489563 ||  || — || September 11, 2007 || Mount Lemmon || Mount Lemmon Survey || MAS || align=right data-sort-value="0.62" | 620 m || 
|-id=564 bgcolor=#fefefe
| 489564 ||  || — || October 4, 2007 || Kitt Peak || Spacewatch || — || align=right data-sort-value="0.70" | 700 m || 
|-id=565 bgcolor=#E9E9E9
| 489565 ||  || — || September 15, 2007 || Mount Lemmon || Mount Lemmon Survey || — || align=right data-sort-value="0.84" | 840 m || 
|-id=566 bgcolor=#d6d6d6
| 489566 ||  || — || September 8, 2007 || Mount Lemmon || Mount Lemmon Survey || — || align=right | 2.5 km || 
|-id=567 bgcolor=#E9E9E9
| 489567 ||  || — || September 12, 2007 || Mount Lemmon || Mount Lemmon Survey || (5) || align=right data-sort-value="0.78" | 780 m || 
|-id=568 bgcolor=#E9E9E9
| 489568 ||  || — || September 12, 2007 || Mount Lemmon || Mount Lemmon Survey || — || align=right | 1.1 km || 
|-id=569 bgcolor=#E9E9E9
| 489569 ||  || — || September 9, 2007 || Mount Lemmon || Mount Lemmon Survey || — || align=right data-sort-value="0.80" | 800 m || 
|-id=570 bgcolor=#E9E9E9
| 489570 ||  || — || October 5, 2007 || Kitt Peak || Spacewatch || MAR || align=right data-sort-value="0.74" | 740 m || 
|-id=571 bgcolor=#d6d6d6
| 489571 ||  || — || October 5, 2007 || Kitt Peak || Spacewatch || EOS || align=right | 1.7 km || 
|-id=572 bgcolor=#fefefe
| 489572 ||  || — || September 8, 2007 || Mount Lemmon || Mount Lemmon Survey || — || align=right data-sort-value="0.75" | 750 m || 
|-id=573 bgcolor=#fefefe
| 489573 ||  || — || September 15, 2007 || Mount Lemmon || Mount Lemmon Survey || — || align=right data-sort-value="0.77" | 770 m || 
|-id=574 bgcolor=#fefefe
| 489574 ||  || — || October 9, 2007 || Needville || Needville Obs. || — || align=right data-sort-value="0.79" | 790 m || 
|-id=575 bgcolor=#E9E9E9
| 489575 ||  || — || October 8, 2007 || Catalina || CSS || — || align=right | 1.7 km || 
|-id=576 bgcolor=#fefefe
| 489576 ||  || — || October 4, 2007 || Kitt Peak || Spacewatch || — || align=right data-sort-value="0.91" | 910 m || 
|-id=577 bgcolor=#E9E9E9
| 489577 ||  || — || September 13, 2007 || Mount Lemmon || Mount Lemmon Survey || — || align=right | 1.1 km || 
|-id=578 bgcolor=#d6d6d6
| 489578 ||  || — || October 8, 2007 || Catalina || CSS || — || align=right | 3.1 km || 
|-id=579 bgcolor=#fefefe
| 489579 ||  || — || October 8, 2007 || Mount Lemmon || Mount Lemmon Survey || — || align=right data-sort-value="0.83" | 830 m || 
|-id=580 bgcolor=#fefefe
| 489580 ||  || — || October 7, 2007 || Catalina || CSS || H || align=right data-sort-value="0.85" | 850 m || 
|-id=581 bgcolor=#d6d6d6
| 489581 ||  || — || October 8, 2007 || Mount Lemmon || Mount Lemmon Survey || — || align=right | 2.1 km || 
|-id=582 bgcolor=#E9E9E9
| 489582 ||  || — || September 12, 2007 || Mount Lemmon || Mount Lemmon Survey || — || align=right data-sort-value="0.71" | 710 m || 
|-id=583 bgcolor=#fefefe
| 489583 ||  || — || September 13, 2007 || Mount Lemmon || Mount Lemmon Survey || — || align=right data-sort-value="0.72" | 720 m || 
|-id=584 bgcolor=#d6d6d6
| 489584 ||  || — || October 8, 2007 || Catalina || CSS || — || align=right | 2.8 km || 
|-id=585 bgcolor=#E9E9E9
| 489585 ||  || — || October 6, 2007 || Kitt Peak || Spacewatch || — || align=right data-sort-value="0.82" | 820 m || 
|-id=586 bgcolor=#d6d6d6
| 489586 ||  || — || September 20, 2001 || Kitt Peak || Spacewatch || THM || align=right | 2.3 km || 
|-id=587 bgcolor=#d6d6d6
| 489587 ||  || — || October 6, 2007 || Kitt Peak || Spacewatch || — || align=right | 2.1 km || 
|-id=588 bgcolor=#fefefe
| 489588 ||  || — || October 6, 2007 || Kitt Peak || Spacewatch || MAS || align=right data-sort-value="0.65" | 650 m || 
|-id=589 bgcolor=#E9E9E9
| 489589 ||  || — || September 15, 2007 || Mount Lemmon || Mount Lemmon Survey || — || align=right | 1.7 km || 
|-id=590 bgcolor=#E9E9E9
| 489590 ||  || — || October 8, 2007 || Catalina || CSS || JUN || align=right | 1.3 km || 
|-id=591 bgcolor=#E9E9E9
| 489591 ||  || — || September 25, 2007 || Mount Lemmon || Mount Lemmon Survey || — || align=right | 2.3 km || 
|-id=592 bgcolor=#fefefe
| 489592 ||  || — || October 9, 2007 || Mount Lemmon || Mount Lemmon Survey || — || align=right data-sort-value="0.74" | 740 m || 
|-id=593 bgcolor=#fefefe
| 489593 ||  || — || September 11, 2007 || Catalina || CSS || — || align=right data-sort-value="0.80" | 800 m || 
|-id=594 bgcolor=#fefefe
| 489594 ||  || — || October 9, 2007 || Socorro || LINEAR || — || align=right | 1.1 km || 
|-id=595 bgcolor=#E9E9E9
| 489595 ||  || — || August 1, 1998 || Caussols || ODAS || — || align=right | 1.1 km || 
|-id=596 bgcolor=#d6d6d6
| 489596 ||  || — || October 8, 2007 || Catalina || CSS || — || align=right | 3.2 km || 
|-id=597 bgcolor=#fefefe
| 489597 ||  || — || October 11, 2007 || Socorro || LINEAR || — || align=right data-sort-value="0.76" | 760 m || 
|-id=598 bgcolor=#fefefe
| 489598 ||  || — || October 9, 2007 || Mount Lemmon || Mount Lemmon Survey || — || align=right data-sort-value="0.93" | 930 m || 
|-id=599 bgcolor=#d6d6d6
| 489599 ||  || — || October 10, 2007 || XuYi || PMO NEO || — || align=right | 3.7 km || 
|-id=600 bgcolor=#fefefe
| 489600 ||  || — || October 12, 2007 || Socorro || LINEAR || NYS || align=right data-sort-value="0.72" | 720 m || 
|}

489601–489700 

|-bgcolor=#E9E9E9
| 489601 ||  || — || October 12, 2007 || Socorro || LINEAR || — || align=right | 1.3 km || 
|-id=602 bgcolor=#d6d6d6
| 489602 ||  || — || April 12, 2004 || Anderson Mesa || LONEOS || TIR || align=right | 3.2 km || 
|-id=603 bgcolor=#d6d6d6
| 489603 Kurtschreckling ||  ||  || October 13, 2007 || Gaisberg || R. Gierlinger || — || align=right | 1.6 km || 
|-id=604 bgcolor=#E9E9E9
| 489604 ||  || — || October 4, 2007 || Mount Lemmon || Mount Lemmon Survey || AEO || align=right data-sort-value="0.95" | 950 m || 
|-id=605 bgcolor=#E9E9E9
| 489605 ||  || — || October 7, 2007 || Mount Lemmon || Mount Lemmon Survey || — || align=right data-sort-value="0.92" | 920 m || 
|-id=606 bgcolor=#fefefe
| 489606 ||  || — || October 7, 2007 || Mount Lemmon || Mount Lemmon Survey || CLA || align=right | 1.5 km || 
|-id=607 bgcolor=#d6d6d6
| 489607 ||  || — || October 8, 2007 || Kitt Peak || Spacewatch || — || align=right | 2.6 km || 
|-id=608 bgcolor=#E9E9E9
| 489608 ||  || — || October 8, 2007 || Mount Lemmon || Mount Lemmon Survey || — || align=right data-sort-value="0.57" | 570 m || 
|-id=609 bgcolor=#E9E9E9
| 489609 ||  || — || September 12, 2007 || Mount Lemmon || Mount Lemmon Survey || — || align=right data-sort-value="0.68" | 680 m || 
|-id=610 bgcolor=#d6d6d6
| 489610 ||  || — || October 8, 2007 || Mount Lemmon || Mount Lemmon Survey || — || align=right | 2.4 km || 
|-id=611 bgcolor=#fefefe
| 489611 ||  || — || October 11, 2007 || Kitt Peak || Spacewatch || — || align=right data-sort-value="0.74" | 740 m || 
|-id=612 bgcolor=#fefefe
| 489612 ||  || — || October 8, 2007 || Kitt Peak || Spacewatch || — || align=right data-sort-value="0.69" | 690 m || 
|-id=613 bgcolor=#d6d6d6
| 489613 ||  || — || October 8, 2007 || Kitt Peak || Spacewatch || — || align=right | 2.9 km || 
|-id=614 bgcolor=#E9E9E9
| 489614 ||  || — || September 9, 2007 || Anderson Mesa || LONEOS || — || align=right | 2.0 km || 
|-id=615 bgcolor=#FA8072
| 489615 ||  || — || October 9, 2007 || Mount Lemmon || Mount Lemmon Survey || — || align=right data-sort-value="0.71" | 710 m || 
|-id=616 bgcolor=#fefefe
| 489616 ||  || — || October 10, 2007 || Kitt Peak || Spacewatch || — || align=right data-sort-value="0.98" | 980 m || 
|-id=617 bgcolor=#d6d6d6
| 489617 ||  || — || October 9, 2007 || Kitt Peak || Spacewatch || — || align=right | 2.8 km || 
|-id=618 bgcolor=#fefefe
| 489618 ||  || — || October 7, 2007 || Catalina || CSS || — || align=right data-sort-value="0.60" | 600 m || 
|-id=619 bgcolor=#fefefe
| 489619 ||  || — || October 4, 2007 || Kitt Peak || Spacewatch || — || align=right data-sort-value="0.52" | 520 m || 
|-id=620 bgcolor=#d6d6d6
| 489620 ||  || — || October 7, 2007 || Mount Lemmon || Mount Lemmon Survey || — || align=right | 2.2 km || 
|-id=621 bgcolor=#d6d6d6
| 489621 ||  || — || September 25, 2007 || Mount Lemmon || Mount Lemmon Survey || — || align=right | 2.5 km || 
|-id=622 bgcolor=#d6d6d6
| 489622 ||  || — || August 23, 2007 || Kitt Peak || Spacewatch || — || align=right | 2.3 km || 
|-id=623 bgcolor=#E9E9E9
| 489623 ||  || — || October 11, 2007 || Kitt Peak || Spacewatch || AGN || align=right | 1.0 km || 
|-id=624 bgcolor=#fefefe
| 489624 ||  || — || October 12, 2007 || Kitt Peak || Spacewatch || NYS || align=right data-sort-value="0.52" | 520 m || 
|-id=625 bgcolor=#d6d6d6
| 489625 ||  || — || October 11, 2007 || Kitt Peak || Spacewatch || 7:4 || align=right | 2.9 km || 
|-id=626 bgcolor=#E9E9E9
| 489626 ||  || — || October 11, 2007 || Kitt Peak || Spacewatch || (5) || align=right data-sort-value="0.61" | 610 m || 
|-id=627 bgcolor=#d6d6d6
| 489627 ||  || — || October 11, 2007 || Kitt Peak || Spacewatch || EOS || align=right | 1.3 km || 
|-id=628 bgcolor=#fefefe
| 489628 ||  || — || October 12, 2007 || Kitt Peak || Spacewatch || V || align=right data-sort-value="0.63" | 630 m || 
|-id=629 bgcolor=#d6d6d6
| 489629 ||  || — || September 10, 2007 || Kitt Peak || Spacewatch || HYG || align=right | 2.5 km || 
|-id=630 bgcolor=#E9E9E9
| 489630 ||  || — || October 11, 2007 || Catalina || CSS || — || align=right | 2.3 km || 
|-id=631 bgcolor=#E9E9E9
| 489631 ||  || — || October 14, 2007 || Mount Lemmon || Mount Lemmon Survey || — || align=right data-sort-value="0.81" | 810 m || 
|-id=632 bgcolor=#E9E9E9
| 489632 ||  || — || October 9, 2007 || Purple Mountain || PMO NEO || — || align=right | 1.6 km || 
|-id=633 bgcolor=#E9E9E9
| 489633 ||  || — || September 12, 2007 || Mount Lemmon || Mount Lemmon Survey || — || align=right | 1.2 km || 
|-id=634 bgcolor=#d6d6d6
| 489634 ||  || — || October 15, 2007 || Kitt Peak || Spacewatch || — || align=right | 1.9 km || 
|-id=635 bgcolor=#E9E9E9
| 489635 ||  || — || October 8, 2007 || Socorro || LINEAR || DOR || align=right | 2.1 km || 
|-id=636 bgcolor=#d6d6d6
| 489636 ||  || — || September 25, 2007 || Mount Lemmon || Mount Lemmon Survey || NAE || align=right | 2.7 km || 
|-id=637 bgcolor=#E9E9E9
| 489637 ||  || — || September 14, 2007 || Catalina || CSS || — || align=right | 2.1 km || 
|-id=638 bgcolor=#fefefe
| 489638 ||  || — || September 15, 2007 || Catalina || CSS || — || align=right | 1.3 km || 
|-id=639 bgcolor=#E9E9E9
| 489639 ||  || — || October 7, 2007 || Catalina || CSS || (5) || align=right data-sort-value="0.69" | 690 m || 
|-id=640 bgcolor=#d6d6d6
| 489640 ||  || — || October 8, 2007 || Mount Lemmon || Mount Lemmon Survey || — || align=right | 2.2 km || 
|-id=641 bgcolor=#E9E9E9
| 489641 ||  || — || October 10, 2007 || Kitt Peak || Spacewatch || MRX || align=right data-sort-value="0.94" | 940 m || 
|-id=642 bgcolor=#d6d6d6
| 489642 ||  || — || October 10, 2007 || Kitt Peak || Spacewatch || Tj (2.99) || align=right | 3.7 km || 
|-id=643 bgcolor=#fefefe
| 489643 ||  || — || September 18, 2007 || Socorro || LINEAR || MAS || align=right data-sort-value="0.83" | 830 m || 
|-id=644 bgcolor=#E9E9E9
| 489644 ||  || — || September 13, 2007 || Mount Lemmon || Mount Lemmon Survey || — || align=right | 1.2 km || 
|-id=645 bgcolor=#fefefe
| 489645 ||  || — || October 7, 2007 || Catalina || CSS || — || align=right data-sort-value="0.78" | 780 m || 
|-id=646 bgcolor=#fefefe
| 489646 ||  || — || October 4, 2007 || Catalina || CSS || — || align=right data-sort-value="0.82" | 820 m || 
|-id=647 bgcolor=#fefefe
| 489647 ||  || — || October 17, 2007 || Anderson Mesa || LONEOS || — || align=right data-sort-value="0.89" | 890 m || 
|-id=648 bgcolor=#fefefe
| 489648 ||  || — || October 16, 2007 || Mount Lemmon || Mount Lemmon Survey || V || align=right data-sort-value="0.59" | 590 m || 
|-id=649 bgcolor=#d6d6d6
| 489649 ||  || — || September 11, 2007 || Mount Lemmon || Mount Lemmon Survey || KOR || align=right | 1.1 km || 
|-id=650 bgcolor=#fefefe
| 489650 ||  || — || September 14, 2007 || Mount Lemmon || Mount Lemmon Survey || — || align=right data-sort-value="0.68" | 680 m || 
|-id=651 bgcolor=#fefefe
| 489651 ||  || — || October 8, 2007 || Kitt Peak || Spacewatch || — || align=right data-sort-value="0.81" | 810 m || 
|-id=652 bgcolor=#E9E9E9
| 489652 ||  || — || October 16, 2007 || Kitt Peak || Spacewatch || — || align=right | 2.4 km || 
|-id=653 bgcolor=#fefefe
| 489653 ||  || — || October 19, 2007 || Catalina || CSS || — || align=right data-sort-value="0.66" | 660 m || 
|-id=654 bgcolor=#d6d6d6
| 489654 ||  || — || October 19, 2007 || Kitt Peak || Spacewatch || — || align=right | 3.3 km || 
|-id=655 bgcolor=#E9E9E9
| 489655 ||  || — || October 8, 2007 || Kitt Peak || Spacewatch || — || align=right | 1.0 km || 
|-id=656 bgcolor=#fefefe
| 489656 ||  || — || September 16, 2003 || Kitt Peak || Spacewatch || — || align=right data-sort-value="0.81" | 810 m || 
|-id=657 bgcolor=#d6d6d6
| 489657 ||  || — || October 30, 2007 || Mount Lemmon || Mount Lemmon Survey || KOR || align=right | 1.2 km || 
|-id=658 bgcolor=#E9E9E9
| 489658 ||  || — || September 18, 2007 || Mount Lemmon || Mount Lemmon Survey || — || align=right | 1.8 km || 
|-id=659 bgcolor=#d6d6d6
| 489659 ||  || — || April 24, 2004 || Kitt Peak || Spacewatch || — || align=right | 2.8 km || 
|-id=660 bgcolor=#d6d6d6
| 489660 ||  || — || September 10, 2007 || Mount Lemmon || Mount Lemmon Survey || — || align=right | 2.4 km || 
|-id=661 bgcolor=#d6d6d6
| 489661 ||  || — || October 30, 2007 || Kitt Peak || Spacewatch || THM || align=right | 1.7 km || 
|-id=662 bgcolor=#E9E9E9
| 489662 ||  || — || September 15, 2007 || Mount Lemmon || Mount Lemmon Survey || critical || align=right data-sort-value="0.84" | 840 m || 
|-id=663 bgcolor=#fefefe
| 489663 ||  || — || October 30, 2007 || Kitt Peak || Spacewatch || NYS || align=right data-sort-value="0.44" | 440 m || 
|-id=664 bgcolor=#E9E9E9
| 489664 ||  || — || October 31, 2007 || Kitt Peak || Spacewatch || — || align=right | 1.1 km || 
|-id=665 bgcolor=#fefefe
| 489665 ||  || — || October 20, 2007 || Kitt Peak || Spacewatch || — || align=right data-sort-value="0.87" | 870 m || 
|-id=666 bgcolor=#E9E9E9
| 489666 ||  || — || October 20, 2007 || Kitt Peak || Spacewatch || BRG || align=right data-sort-value="0.91" | 910 m || 
|-id=667 bgcolor=#d6d6d6
| 489667 ||  || — || September 14, 2007 || Mount Lemmon || Mount Lemmon Survey || — || align=right | 1.8 km || 
|-id=668 bgcolor=#d6d6d6
| 489668 ||  || — || October 23, 2007 || Kitt Peak || Spacewatch || Tj (2.99) || align=right | 3.3 km || 
|-id=669 bgcolor=#d6d6d6
| 489669 ||  || — || October 19, 2007 || Mount Lemmon || Mount Lemmon Survey || — || align=right | 2.2 km || 
|-id=670 bgcolor=#E9E9E9
| 489670 ||  || — || October 19, 2007 || Mount Lemmon || Mount Lemmon Survey || — || align=right | 1.6 km || 
|-id=671 bgcolor=#E9E9E9
| 489671 ||  || — || October 16, 2007 || Mount Lemmon || Mount Lemmon Survey || — || align=right | 1.2 km || 
|-id=672 bgcolor=#FA8072
| 489672 ||  || — || November 5, 2007 || Kitt Peak || Spacewatch || H || align=right data-sort-value="0.75" | 750 m || 
|-id=673 bgcolor=#fefefe
| 489673 ||  || — || November 1, 2007 || Kitt Peak || Spacewatch || — || align=right data-sort-value="0.46" | 460 m || 
|-id=674 bgcolor=#E9E9E9
| 489674 ||  || — || October 10, 2007 || Mount Lemmon || Mount Lemmon Survey || — || align=right | 1.3 km || 
|-id=675 bgcolor=#E9E9E9
| 489675 ||  || — || November 3, 2007 || Kitt Peak || Spacewatch || — || align=right | 1.9 km || 
|-id=676 bgcolor=#d6d6d6
| 489676 ||  || — || November 1, 2007 || Kitt Peak || Spacewatch || — || align=right | 2.1 km || 
|-id=677 bgcolor=#E9E9E9
| 489677 ||  || — || October 16, 2007 || Mount Lemmon || Mount Lemmon Survey || — || align=right data-sort-value="0.72" | 720 m || 
|-id=678 bgcolor=#E9E9E9
| 489678 ||  || — || November 1, 2007 || Kitt Peak || Spacewatch || — || align=right data-sort-value="0.85" | 850 m || 
|-id=679 bgcolor=#d6d6d6
| 489679 ||  || — || October 9, 2007 || Kitt Peak || Spacewatch || — || align=right | 2.1 km || 
|-id=680 bgcolor=#E9E9E9
| 489680 ||  || — || November 1, 2007 || Kitt Peak || Spacewatch || — || align=right | 1.1 km || 
|-id=681 bgcolor=#E9E9E9
| 489681 ||  || — || November 1, 2007 || Kitt Peak || Spacewatch || GEFcritical || align=right data-sort-value="0.82" | 820 m || 
|-id=682 bgcolor=#E9E9E9
| 489682 ||  || — || November 1, 2007 || Kitt Peak || Spacewatch || — || align=right | 1.0 km || 
|-id=683 bgcolor=#E9E9E9
| 489683 ||  || — || October 7, 2007 || Mount Lemmon || Mount Lemmon Survey || — || align=right | 1.3 km || 
|-id=684 bgcolor=#d6d6d6
| 489684 ||  || — || November 3, 2007 || Kitt Peak || Spacewatch || — || align=right | 2.4 km || 
|-id=685 bgcolor=#fefefe
| 489685 ||  || — || October 9, 2007 || Catalina || CSS || H || align=right data-sort-value="0.75" | 750 m || 
|-id=686 bgcolor=#fefefe
| 489686 ||  || — || November 2, 2007 || Socorro || LINEAR || H || align=right data-sort-value="0.73" | 730 m || 
|-id=687 bgcolor=#E9E9E9
| 489687 ||  || — || October 12, 2007 || Kitt Peak || Spacewatch || — || align=right | 1.6 km || 
|-id=688 bgcolor=#E9E9E9
| 489688 ||  || — || September 26, 2007 || Mount Lemmon || Mount Lemmon Survey || — || align=right | 2.0 km || 
|-id=689 bgcolor=#fefefe
| 489689 ||  || — || September 26, 2007 || Mount Lemmon || Mount Lemmon Survey || — || align=right data-sort-value="0.60" | 600 m || 
|-id=690 bgcolor=#fefefe
| 489690 ||  || — || September 26, 2007 || Mount Lemmon || Mount Lemmon Survey || — || align=right data-sort-value="0.72" | 720 m || 
|-id=691 bgcolor=#E9E9E9
| 489691 ||  || — || October 12, 2007 || Socorro || LINEAR || — || align=right | 1.0 km || 
|-id=692 bgcolor=#E9E9E9
| 489692 ||  || — || November 3, 2007 || Kitt Peak || Spacewatch || — || align=right | 1.4 km || 
|-id=693 bgcolor=#E9E9E9
| 489693 ||  || — || November 3, 2007 || Kitt Peak || Spacewatch || — || align=right data-sort-value="0.66" | 660 m || 
|-id=694 bgcolor=#fefefe
| 489694 ||  || — || October 10, 2007 || Mount Lemmon || Mount Lemmon Survey || — || align=right data-sort-value="0.77" | 770 m || 
|-id=695 bgcolor=#fefefe
| 489695 ||  || — || November 3, 2007 || Kitt Peak || Spacewatch || — || align=right data-sort-value="0.75" | 750 m || 
|-id=696 bgcolor=#E9E9E9
| 489696 ||  || — || November 4, 2007 || Kitt Peak || Spacewatch || EUN || align=right data-sort-value="0.76" | 760 m || 
|-id=697 bgcolor=#fefefe
| 489697 ||  || — || September 12, 2007 || Mount Lemmon || Mount Lemmon Survey || NYS || align=right data-sort-value="0.56" | 560 m || 
|-id=698 bgcolor=#E9E9E9
| 489698 ||  || — || October 18, 2007 || Kitt Peak || Spacewatch || — || align=right | 1.3 km || 
|-id=699 bgcolor=#E9E9E9
| 489699 ||  || — || September 14, 2007 || Mount Lemmon || Mount Lemmon Survey || — || align=right | 1.1 km || 
|-id=700 bgcolor=#fefefe
| 489700 ||  || — || November 5, 2007 || XuYi || PMO NEO || H || align=right data-sort-value="0.75" | 750 m || 
|}

489701–489800 

|-bgcolor=#E9E9E9
| 489701 ||  || — || November 3, 2007 || Mount Lemmon || Mount Lemmon Survey || — || align=right | 1.6 km || 
|-id=702 bgcolor=#E9E9E9
| 489702 ||  || — || November 5, 2007 || Kitt Peak || Spacewatch || — || align=right data-sort-value="0.68" | 680 m || 
|-id=703 bgcolor=#d6d6d6
| 489703 ||  || — || September 10, 2007 || Mount Lemmon || Mount Lemmon Survey || — || align=right | 2.9 km || 
|-id=704 bgcolor=#fefefe
| 489704 ||  || — || November 5, 2007 || Kitt Peak || Spacewatch || — || align=right data-sort-value="0.56" | 560 m || 
|-id=705 bgcolor=#d6d6d6
| 489705 ||  || — || November 5, 2007 || Kitt Peak || Spacewatch || — || align=right | 2.0 km || 
|-id=706 bgcolor=#E9E9E9
| 489706 ||  || — || November 7, 2007 || Kitt Peak || Spacewatch || — || align=right data-sort-value="0.68" | 680 m || 
|-id=707 bgcolor=#E9E9E9
| 489707 ||  || — || September 14, 2007 || Mount Lemmon || Mount Lemmon Survey || — || align=right data-sort-value="0.84" | 840 m || 
|-id=708 bgcolor=#E9E9E9
| 489708 ||  || — || November 8, 2007 || Catalina || CSS || — || align=right data-sort-value="0.93" | 930 m || 
|-id=709 bgcolor=#d6d6d6
| 489709 ||  || — || November 6, 2007 || Kitt Peak || Spacewatch || — || align=right | 3.2 km || 
|-id=710 bgcolor=#fefefe
| 489710 ||  || — || November 1, 2007 || Kitt Peak || Spacewatch || NYS || align=right data-sort-value="0.46" | 460 m || 
|-id=711 bgcolor=#d6d6d6
| 489711 ||  || — || November 1, 2007 || Kitt Peak || Spacewatch || EOS || align=right | 1.8 km || 
|-id=712 bgcolor=#d6d6d6
| 489712 ||  || — || October 17, 2007 || Mount Lemmon || Mount Lemmon Survey || KOR || align=right | 1.3 km || 
|-id=713 bgcolor=#d6d6d6
| 489713 ||  || — || October 30, 2007 || Mount Lemmon || Mount Lemmon Survey || — || align=right | 2.1 km || 
|-id=714 bgcolor=#fefefe
| 489714 ||  || — || November 11, 2007 || Mount Lemmon || Mount Lemmon Survey || — || align=right data-sort-value="0.78" | 780 m || 
|-id=715 bgcolor=#d6d6d6
| 489715 ||  || — || November 5, 2007 || Kitt Peak || Spacewatch || — || align=right | 2.5 km || 
|-id=716 bgcolor=#E9E9E9
| 489716 ||  || — || November 13, 2007 || Mount Lemmon || Mount Lemmon Survey || — || align=right | 1.1 km || 
|-id=717 bgcolor=#fefefe
| 489717 ||  || — || October 9, 2007 || Mount Lemmon || Mount Lemmon Survey || — || align=right data-sort-value="0.53" | 530 m || 
|-id=718 bgcolor=#fefefe
| 489718 ||  || — || November 14, 2007 || Bisei SG Center || BATTeRS || H || align=right data-sort-value="0.69" | 690 m || 
|-id=719 bgcolor=#fefefe
| 489719 ||  || — || November 2, 2007 || Catalina || CSS || — || align=right | 1.2 km || 
|-id=720 bgcolor=#fefefe
| 489720 ||  || — || November 14, 2007 || Kitt Peak || Spacewatch || — || align=right data-sort-value="0.69" | 690 m || 
|-id=721 bgcolor=#E9E9E9
| 489721 ||  || — || November 14, 2007 || Kitt Peak || Spacewatch || (5) || align=right data-sort-value="0.59" | 590 m || 
|-id=722 bgcolor=#E9E9E9
| 489722 ||  || — || November 14, 2007 || Kitt Peak || Spacewatch || — || align=right data-sort-value="0.76" | 760 m || 
|-id=723 bgcolor=#E9E9E9
| 489723 ||  || — || November 2, 2007 || Mount Lemmon || Mount Lemmon Survey || — || align=right | 1.1 km || 
|-id=724 bgcolor=#E9E9E9
| 489724 ||  || — || November 2, 2007 || Kitt Peak || Spacewatch || — || align=right data-sort-value="0.82" | 820 m || 
|-id=725 bgcolor=#d6d6d6
| 489725 ||  || — || November 5, 2007 || Kitt Peak || Spacewatch || — || align=right | 2.1 km || 
|-id=726 bgcolor=#d6d6d6
| 489726 ||  || — || September 15, 2007 || Mount Lemmon || Mount Lemmon Survey || — || align=right | 2.6 km || 
|-id=727 bgcolor=#E9E9E9
| 489727 ||  || — || November 1, 2007 || Kitt Peak || Spacewatch || — || align=right data-sort-value="0.76" | 760 m || 
|-id=728 bgcolor=#E9E9E9
| 489728 ||  || — || October 30, 2007 || Kitt Peak || Spacewatch || — || align=right data-sort-value="0.72" | 720 m || 
|-id=729 bgcolor=#E9E9E9
| 489729 ||  || — || November 18, 2007 || Socorro || LINEAR || — || align=right | 1.2 km || 
|-id=730 bgcolor=#E9E9E9
| 489730 ||  || — || November 17, 2007 || Kitt Peak || Spacewatch || HOF || align=right | 2.2 km || 
|-id=731 bgcolor=#E9E9E9
| 489731 ||  || — || November 19, 2007 || Mount Lemmon || Mount Lemmon Survey || — || align=right data-sort-value="0.94" | 940 m || 
|-id=732 bgcolor=#fefefe
| 489732 ||  || — || November 17, 2007 || Socorro || LINEAR || (2076) || align=right data-sort-value="0.87" | 870 m || 
|-id=733 bgcolor=#E9E9E9
| 489733 ||  || — || November 18, 2007 || Mount Lemmon || Mount Lemmon Survey || — || align=right | 1.1 km || 
|-id=734 bgcolor=#E9E9E9
| 489734 ||  || — || November 19, 2007 || Kitt Peak || Spacewatch || — || align=right data-sort-value="0.87" | 870 m || 
|-id=735 bgcolor=#E9E9E9
| 489735 ||  || — || November 6, 2007 || Kitt Peak || Spacewatch || — || align=right data-sort-value="0.88" | 880 m || 
|-id=736 bgcolor=#E9E9E9
| 489736 ||  || — || November 7, 2007 || Kitt Peak || Spacewatch || — || align=right | 1.5 km || 
|-id=737 bgcolor=#E9E9E9
| 489737 ||  || — || December 4, 2007 || Mount Lemmon || Mount Lemmon Survey || — || align=right | 1.1 km || 
|-id=738 bgcolor=#E9E9E9
| 489738 ||  || — || December 10, 2007 || Socorro || LINEAR || — || align=right | 1.6 km || 
|-id=739 bgcolor=#E9E9E9
| 489739 ||  || — || December 13, 2007 || Socorro || LINEAR || — || align=right | 1.8 km || 
|-id=740 bgcolor=#E9E9E9
| 489740 ||  || — || November 2, 2007 || Mount Lemmon || Mount Lemmon Survey || — || align=right data-sort-value="0.95" | 950 m || 
|-id=741 bgcolor=#E9E9E9
| 489741 ||  || — || December 15, 2007 || Catalina || CSS || — || align=right | 1.6 km || 
|-id=742 bgcolor=#E9E9E9
| 489742 ||  || — || December 4, 2007 || Kitt Peak || Spacewatch || — || align=right data-sort-value="0.86" | 860 m || 
|-id=743 bgcolor=#E9E9E9
| 489743 ||  || — || December 6, 2007 || Mount Lemmon || Mount Lemmon Survey || — || align=right | 1.5 km || 
|-id=744 bgcolor=#E9E9E9
| 489744 ||  || — || December 14, 2007 || Mount Lemmon || Mount Lemmon Survey || — || align=right | 1.1 km || 
|-id=745 bgcolor=#fefefe
| 489745 ||  || — || December 4, 2007 || Kitt Peak || Spacewatch || ERI || align=right | 1.6 km || 
|-id=746 bgcolor=#d6d6d6
| 489746 ||  || — || November 20, 2007 || Mount Lemmon || Mount Lemmon Survey || — || align=right | 2.7 km || 
|-id=747 bgcolor=#E9E9E9
| 489747 ||  || — || December 16, 2007 || Mount Lemmon || Mount Lemmon Survey || — || align=right | 1.2 km || 
|-id=748 bgcolor=#d6d6d6
| 489748 ||  || — || December 28, 2007 || Kitt Peak || Spacewatch || — || align=right | 1.9 km || 
|-id=749 bgcolor=#E9E9E9
| 489749 ||  || — || December 30, 2007 || Mount Lemmon || Mount Lemmon Survey || — || align=right | 1.5 km || 
|-id=750 bgcolor=#E9E9E9
| 489750 ||  || — || December 20, 2007 || Kitt Peak || Spacewatch || — || align=right | 1.2 km || 
|-id=751 bgcolor=#d6d6d6
| 489751 ||  || — || December 20, 2007 || Kitt Peak || Spacewatch || — || align=right | 2.3 km || 
|-id=752 bgcolor=#d6d6d6
| 489752 ||  || — || September 19, 2006 || Kitt Peak || Spacewatch || — || align=right | 2.1 km || 
|-id=753 bgcolor=#fefefe
| 489753 ||  || — || December 30, 2007 || Mount Lemmon || Mount Lemmon Survey || — || align=right data-sort-value="0.60" | 600 m || 
|-id=754 bgcolor=#E9E9E9
| 489754 ||  || — || December 17, 2007 || Mount Lemmon || Mount Lemmon Survey || — || align=right | 1.7 km || 
|-id=755 bgcolor=#d6d6d6
| 489755 ||  || — || December 16, 2007 || Socorro || LINEAR || — || align=right | 6.8 km || 
|-id=756 bgcolor=#E9E9E9
| 489756 ||  || — || November 6, 2007 || Mount Lemmon || Mount Lemmon Survey || ADE || align=right | 1.8 km || 
|-id=757 bgcolor=#d6d6d6
| 489757 ||  || — || January 10, 2008 || Mount Lemmon || Mount Lemmon Survey || — || align=right | 3.0 km || 
|-id=758 bgcolor=#E9E9E9
| 489758 ||  || — || January 10, 2008 || Kitt Peak || Spacewatch || — || align=right | 1.1 km || 
|-id=759 bgcolor=#E9E9E9
| 489759 ||  || — || December 30, 2007 || Kitt Peak || Spacewatch || — || align=right | 1.2 km || 
|-id=760 bgcolor=#d6d6d6
| 489760 ||  || — || November 7, 2007 || Mount Lemmon || Mount Lemmon Survey || — || align=right | 2.8 km || 
|-id=761 bgcolor=#E9E9E9
| 489761 ||  || — || January 10, 2008 || Kitt Peak || Spacewatch || — || align=right | 1.2 km || 
|-id=762 bgcolor=#d6d6d6
| 489762 ||  || — || January 11, 2008 || Kitt Peak || Spacewatch || EOS || align=right | 2.1 km || 
|-id=763 bgcolor=#d6d6d6
| 489763 ||  || — || January 11, 2008 || Kitt Peak || Spacewatch || — || align=right | 2.0 km || 
|-id=764 bgcolor=#fefefe
| 489764 ||  || — || October 24, 2003 || Kitt Peak || Spacewatch || MAS || align=right data-sort-value="0.54" | 540 m || 
|-id=765 bgcolor=#d6d6d6
| 489765 ||  || — || December 31, 2007 || Kitt Peak || Spacewatch || THM || align=right | 2.0 km || 
|-id=766 bgcolor=#E9E9E9
| 489766 ||  || — || January 11, 2008 || Kitt Peak || Spacewatch || EUN || align=right | 1.5 km || 
|-id=767 bgcolor=#E9E9E9
| 489767 ||  || — || January 10, 2008 || Catalina || CSS || — || align=right | 1.1 km || 
|-id=768 bgcolor=#E9E9E9
| 489768 ||  || — || January 13, 2008 || Kitt Peak || Spacewatch || (5) || align=right data-sort-value="0.98" | 980 m || 
|-id=769 bgcolor=#E9E9E9
| 489769 ||  || — || November 8, 2007 || Mount Lemmon || Mount Lemmon Survey || — || align=right | 1.4 km || 
|-id=770 bgcolor=#E9E9E9
| 489770 ||  || — || December 31, 2007 || Mount Lemmon || Mount Lemmon Survey || — || align=right | 1.0 km || 
|-id=771 bgcolor=#E9E9E9
| 489771 ||  || — || January 15, 2008 || Kitt Peak || Spacewatch || — || align=right | 1.2 km || 
|-id=772 bgcolor=#E9E9E9
| 489772 ||  || — || January 15, 2008 || Mount Lemmon || Mount Lemmon Survey || — || align=right | 1.1 km || 
|-id=773 bgcolor=#d6d6d6
| 489773 ||  || — || January 15, 2008 || Kitt Peak || Spacewatch || — || align=right | 2.7 km || 
|-id=774 bgcolor=#E9E9E9
| 489774 ||  || — || January 15, 2008 || Mount Lemmon || Mount Lemmon Survey || — || align=right | 1.2 km || 
|-id=775 bgcolor=#E9E9E9
| 489775 ||  || — || January 16, 2008 || Kitt Peak || Spacewatch || — || align=right | 1.4 km || 
|-id=776 bgcolor=#E9E9E9
| 489776 ||  || — || December 19, 2007 || Mount Lemmon || Mount Lemmon Survey || ADE || align=right | 1.4 km || 
|-id=777 bgcolor=#E9E9E9
| 489777 ||  || — || January 18, 2008 || Kitt Peak || Spacewatch || — || align=right data-sort-value="0.97" | 970 m || 
|-id=778 bgcolor=#E9E9E9
| 489778 ||  || — || December 31, 2007 || Mount Lemmon || Mount Lemmon Survey || — || align=right | 1.2 km || 
|-id=779 bgcolor=#E9E9E9
| 489779 ||  || — || February 2, 2008 || Kitt Peak || Spacewatch || — || align=right | 1.3 km || 
|-id=780 bgcolor=#E9E9E9
| 489780 ||  || — || February 2, 2008 || Kitt Peak || Spacewatch || — || align=right | 1.5 km || 
|-id=781 bgcolor=#d6d6d6
| 489781 ||  || — || February 2, 2008 || Kitt Peak || Spacewatch || — || align=right | 2.2 km || 
|-id=782 bgcolor=#E9E9E9
| 489782 ||  || — || January 15, 2008 || Mount Lemmon || Mount Lemmon Survey || — || align=right | 1.2 km || 
|-id=783 bgcolor=#E9E9E9
| 489783 ||  || — || February 2, 2008 || Mount Lemmon || Mount Lemmon Survey || — || align=right | 1.2 km || 
|-id=784 bgcolor=#fefefe
| 489784 ||  || — || February 2, 2008 || Kitt Peak || Spacewatch || NYS || align=right data-sort-value="0.56" | 560 m || 
|-id=785 bgcolor=#E9E9E9
| 489785 ||  || — || February 2, 2008 || Kitt Peak || Spacewatch || — || align=right | 1.1 km || 
|-id=786 bgcolor=#E9E9E9
| 489786 ||  || — || December 19, 2007 || Mount Lemmon || Mount Lemmon Survey || — || align=right | 1.7 km || 
|-id=787 bgcolor=#E9E9E9
| 489787 ||  || — || December 5, 2007 || Mount Lemmon || Mount Lemmon Survey || — || align=right | 1.3 km || 
|-id=788 bgcolor=#E9E9E9
| 489788 ||  || — || February 7, 2008 || Kitt Peak || Spacewatch || — || align=right | 1.2 km || 
|-id=789 bgcolor=#E9E9E9
| 489789 ||  || — || February 8, 2008 || Mount Lemmon || Mount Lemmon Survey || — || align=right | 2.1 km || 
|-id=790 bgcolor=#d6d6d6
| 489790 ||  || — || February 9, 2008 || Kitt Peak || Spacewatch || — || align=right | 2.3 km || 
|-id=791 bgcolor=#E9E9E9
| 489791 ||  || — || February 10, 2008 || Kitt Peak || Spacewatch || — || align=right | 1.3 km || 
|-id=792 bgcolor=#E9E9E9
| 489792 ||  || — || February 8, 2008 || Kitt Peak || Spacewatch || — || align=right | 1.3 km || 
|-id=793 bgcolor=#E9E9E9
| 489793 ||  || — || January 30, 2008 || Mount Lemmon || Mount Lemmon Survey || — || align=right | 2.0 km || 
|-id=794 bgcolor=#E9E9E9
| 489794 ||  || — || February 9, 2008 || Kitt Peak || Spacewatch || — || align=right | 1.2 km || 
|-id=795 bgcolor=#E9E9E9
| 489795 ||  || — || February 9, 2008 || Kitt Peak || Spacewatch || — || align=right | 1.2 km || 
|-id=796 bgcolor=#E9E9E9
| 489796 ||  || — || February 8, 2008 || Mount Lemmon || Mount Lemmon Survey || — || align=right | 1.6 km || 
|-id=797 bgcolor=#E9E9E9
| 489797 ||  || — || January 10, 2008 || Mount Lemmon || Mount Lemmon Survey || MAR || align=right data-sort-value="0.99" | 990 m || 
|-id=798 bgcolor=#E9E9E9
| 489798 ||  || — || February 9, 2008 || Catalina || CSS || — || align=right | 1.4 km || 
|-id=799 bgcolor=#E9E9E9
| 489799 ||  || — || February 9, 2008 || Kitt Peak || Spacewatch || — || align=right | 1.3 km || 
|-id=800 bgcolor=#E9E9E9
| 489800 ||  || — || January 13, 2008 || Kitt Peak || Spacewatch || — || align=right | 1.4 km || 
|}

489801–489900 

|-bgcolor=#E9E9E9
| 489801 ||  || — || February 12, 2008 || Mount Lemmon || Mount Lemmon Survey || — || align=right | 2.2 km || 
|-id=802 bgcolor=#FA8072
| 489802 ||  || — || February 2, 2008 || Kitt Peak || Spacewatch || — || align=right data-sort-value="0.50" | 500 m || 
|-id=803 bgcolor=#E9E9E9
| 489803 ||  || — || February 11, 2008 || Mount Lemmon || Mount Lemmon Survey || — || align=right | 2.3 km || 
|-id=804 bgcolor=#E9E9E9
| 489804 ||  || — || January 17, 2008 || Mount Lemmon || Mount Lemmon Survey || — || align=right | 1.5 km || 
|-id=805 bgcolor=#d6d6d6
| 489805 ||  || — || February 2, 2008 || Kitt Peak || Spacewatch || 7:4 || align=right | 3.0 km || 
|-id=806 bgcolor=#E9E9E9
| 489806 ||  || — || February 11, 2008 || Mount Lemmon || Mount Lemmon Survey || — || align=right | 1.5 km || 
|-id=807 bgcolor=#E9E9E9
| 489807 ||  || — || February 9, 2008 || Kitt Peak || Spacewatch || — || align=right | 1.4 km || 
|-id=808 bgcolor=#E9E9E9
| 489808 ||  || — || February 2, 2008 || Socorro || LINEAR || — || align=right | 1.4 km || 
|-id=809 bgcolor=#E9E9E9
| 489809 ||  || — || February 2, 2008 || Catalina || CSS || — || align=right | 1.3 km || 
|-id=810 bgcolor=#E9E9E9
| 489810 ||  || — || January 16, 2008 || Kitt Peak || Spacewatch || — || align=right | 1.2 km || 
|-id=811 bgcolor=#E9E9E9
| 489811 ||  || — || February 26, 2008 || Kitt Peak || Spacewatch || — || align=right data-sort-value="0.99" | 990 m || 
|-id=812 bgcolor=#E9E9E9
| 489812 ||  || — || January 30, 2008 || Mount Lemmon || Mount Lemmon Survey || (5) || align=right data-sort-value="0.77" | 770 m || 
|-id=813 bgcolor=#fefefe
| 489813 ||  || — || January 19, 2008 || Kitt Peak || Spacewatch || MAS || align=right data-sort-value="0.60" | 600 m || 
|-id=814 bgcolor=#E9E9E9
| 489814 ||  || — || February 28, 2008 || Kitt Peak || Spacewatch || — || align=right | 1.5 km || 
|-id=815 bgcolor=#E9E9E9
| 489815 ||  || — || February 27, 2008 || Mount Lemmon || Mount Lemmon Survey || — || align=right | 1.9 km || 
|-id=816 bgcolor=#fefefe
| 489816 ||  || — || February 28, 2008 || Kitt Peak || Spacewatch || — || align=right data-sort-value="0.69" | 690 m || 
|-id=817 bgcolor=#d6d6d6
| 489817 ||  || — || February 28, 2008 || Mount Lemmon || Mount Lemmon Survey || — || align=right | 2.0 km || 
|-id=818 bgcolor=#E9E9E9
| 489818 ||  || — || March 1, 2008 || Kitt Peak || Spacewatch || — || align=right | 1.7 km || 
|-id=819 bgcolor=#E9E9E9
| 489819 ||  || — || March 1, 2008 || Kanab || E. E. Sheridan || — || align=right | 1.5 km || 
|-id=820 bgcolor=#E9E9E9
| 489820 ||  || — || March 1, 2008 || Kitt Peak || Spacewatch || JUN || align=right data-sort-value="0.74" | 740 m || 
|-id=821 bgcolor=#E9E9E9
| 489821 ||  || — || March 1, 2008 || Kitt Peak || Spacewatch || — || align=right | 1.8 km || 
|-id=822 bgcolor=#E9E9E9
| 489822 ||  || — || January 30, 2008 || Mount Lemmon || Mount Lemmon Survey || — || align=right | 2.3 km || 
|-id=823 bgcolor=#E9E9E9
| 489823 ||  || — || March 4, 2008 || Kitt Peak || Spacewatch || — || align=right | 1.5 km || 
|-id=824 bgcolor=#fefefe
| 489824 ||  || — || March 4, 2008 || Kitt Peak || Spacewatch || — || align=right data-sort-value="0.61" | 610 m || 
|-id=825 bgcolor=#E9E9E9
| 489825 ||  || — || March 6, 2008 || Mount Lemmon || Mount Lemmon Survey || — || align=right | 1.3 km || 
|-id=826 bgcolor=#E9E9E9
| 489826 ||  || — || March 6, 2008 || Kitt Peak || Spacewatch || — || align=right | 1.9 km || 
|-id=827 bgcolor=#C2FFFF
| 489827 ||  || — || March 10, 2008 || Mount Lemmon || Mount Lemmon Survey || L5 || align=right | 8.5 km || 
|-id=828 bgcolor=#E9E9E9
| 489828 ||  || — || February 28, 2008 || Kitt Peak || Spacewatch || — || align=right | 1.2 km || 
|-id=829 bgcolor=#E9E9E9
| 489829 ||  || — || February 14, 2008 || Catalina || CSS || — || align=right | 1.9 km || 
|-id=830 bgcolor=#E9E9E9
| 489830 ||  || — || February 10, 2008 || Socorro || LINEAR || JUN || align=right | 1.1 km || 
|-id=831 bgcolor=#E9E9E9
| 489831 ||  || — || March 5, 2008 || Mount Lemmon || Mount Lemmon Survey || — || align=right | 1.3 km || 
|-id=832 bgcolor=#E9E9E9
| 489832 ||  || — || February 7, 2008 || Mount Lemmon || Mount Lemmon Survey || — || align=right | 1.8 km || 
|-id=833 bgcolor=#E9E9E9
| 489833 ||  || — || February 6, 2008 || XuYi || PMO NEO || — || align=right | 1.7 km || 
|-id=834 bgcolor=#d6d6d6
| 489834 ||  || — || February 9, 2008 || Kitt Peak || Spacewatch || 7:4 || align=right | 2.7 km || 
|-id=835 bgcolor=#E9E9E9
| 489835 ||  || — || March 6, 2008 || Mount Lemmon || Mount Lemmon Survey || — || align=right | 1.8 km || 
|-id=836 bgcolor=#E9E9E9
| 489836 ||  || — || January 19, 2008 || Mount Lemmon || Mount Lemmon Survey || — || align=right | 1.5 km || 
|-id=837 bgcolor=#E9E9E9
| 489837 ||  || — || March 10, 2008 || Kitt Peak || Spacewatch || JUN || align=right | 1.00 km || 
|-id=838 bgcolor=#E9E9E9
| 489838 ||  || — || March 3, 2008 || XuYi || PMO NEO || — || align=right | 1.3 km || 
|-id=839 bgcolor=#E9E9E9
| 489839 ||  || — || March 10, 2008 || Kitt Peak || Spacewatch || — || align=right | 1.3 km || 
|-id=840 bgcolor=#E9E9E9
| 489840 ||  || — || March 1, 2008 || Kitt Peak || Spacewatch || — || align=right | 1.4 km || 
|-id=841 bgcolor=#E9E9E9
| 489841 ||  || — || March 10, 2008 || Kitt Peak || Spacewatch || JUN || align=right data-sort-value="0.73" | 730 m || 
|-id=842 bgcolor=#E9E9E9
| 489842 ||  || — || February 2, 2008 || Kitt Peak || Spacewatch || — || align=right | 2.0 km || 
|-id=843 bgcolor=#E9E9E9
| 489843 ||  || — || March 26, 2008 || Mount Lemmon || Mount Lemmon Survey || — || align=right | 1.3 km || 
|-id=844 bgcolor=#E9E9E9
| 489844 ||  || — || March 5, 2008 || Mount Lemmon || Mount Lemmon Survey || HOF || align=right | 1.9 km || 
|-id=845 bgcolor=#E9E9E9
| 489845 ||  || — || March 28, 2008 || Mount Lemmon || Mount Lemmon Survey || — || align=right | 1.2 km || 
|-id=846 bgcolor=#E9E9E9
| 489846 ||  || — || March 10, 2008 || Kitt Peak || Spacewatch || — || align=right | 1.6 km || 
|-id=847 bgcolor=#E9E9E9
| 489847 ||  || — || March 1, 2008 || Kitt Peak || Spacewatch || — || align=right | 2.0 km || 
|-id=848 bgcolor=#E9E9E9
| 489848 ||  || — || March 13, 2008 || Kitt Peak || Spacewatch || — || align=right | 1.3 km || 
|-id=849 bgcolor=#E9E9E9
| 489849 ||  || — || February 12, 2008 || Mount Lemmon || Mount Lemmon Survey || GEF || align=right data-sort-value="0.96" | 960 m || 
|-id=850 bgcolor=#E9E9E9
| 489850 ||  || — || March 30, 2008 || Kitt Peak || Spacewatch || — || align=right | 1.5 km || 
|-id=851 bgcolor=#E9E9E9
| 489851 ||  || — || March 15, 2008 || Mount Lemmon || Mount Lemmon Survey || — || align=right | 1.9 km || 
|-id=852 bgcolor=#d6d6d6
| 489852 ||  || — || March 4, 2008 || Kitt Peak || Spacewatch || — || align=right | 3.5 km || 
|-id=853 bgcolor=#E9E9E9
| 489853 ||  || — || March 5, 2008 || Mount Lemmon || Mount Lemmon Survey || NEM || align=right | 2.0 km || 
|-id=854 bgcolor=#E9E9E9
| 489854 ||  || — || March 30, 2008 || Kitt Peak || Spacewatch || — || align=right | 2.1 km || 
|-id=855 bgcolor=#E9E9E9
| 489855 ||  || — || March 31, 2008 || Kitt Peak || Spacewatch || — || align=right | 1.7 km || 
|-id=856 bgcolor=#E9E9E9
| 489856 ||  || — || March 31, 2008 || Mount Lemmon || Mount Lemmon Survey || HOF || align=right | 2.2 km || 
|-id=857 bgcolor=#E9E9E9
| 489857 ||  || — || March 31, 2008 || Mount Lemmon || Mount Lemmon Survey || WIT || align=right | 1.0 km || 
|-id=858 bgcolor=#E9E9E9
| 489858 ||  || — || March 28, 2008 || Kitt Peak || Spacewatch || — || align=right | 2.0 km || 
|-id=859 bgcolor=#E9E9E9
| 489859 ||  || — || March 28, 2008 || Mount Lemmon || Mount Lemmon Survey || AGN || align=right data-sort-value="0.88" | 880 m || 
|-id=860 bgcolor=#E9E9E9
| 489860 ||  || — || March 5, 2008 || Kitt Peak || Spacewatch || — || align=right | 2.2 km || 
|-id=861 bgcolor=#E9E9E9
| 489861 ||  || — || March 5, 2008 || Mount Lemmon || Mount Lemmon Survey || — || align=right | 2.0 km || 
|-id=862 bgcolor=#d6d6d6
| 489862 ||  || — || March 4, 2008 || Mount Lemmon || Mount Lemmon Survey || — || align=right | 2.8 km || 
|-id=863 bgcolor=#E9E9E9
| 489863 ||  || — || March 31, 2008 || Kitt Peak || Spacewatch || — || align=right | 1.6 km || 
|-id=864 bgcolor=#E9E9E9
| 489864 ||  || — || April 3, 2008 || Kitt Peak || Spacewatch || — || align=right | 1.8 km || 
|-id=865 bgcolor=#E9E9E9
| 489865 ||  || — || April 3, 2008 || Mount Lemmon || Mount Lemmon Survey || — || align=right | 1.1 km || 
|-id=866 bgcolor=#E9E9E9
| 489866 ||  || — || March 28, 2008 || Mount Lemmon || Mount Lemmon Survey || — || align=right | 1.8 km || 
|-id=867 bgcolor=#E9E9E9
| 489867 ||  || — || April 5, 2008 || Mount Lemmon || Mount Lemmon Survey || — || align=right | 1.7 km || 
|-id=868 bgcolor=#E9E9E9
| 489868 ||  || — || April 6, 2008 || Kitt Peak || Spacewatch || — || align=right | 1.8 km || 
|-id=869 bgcolor=#E9E9E9
| 489869 ||  || — || April 6, 2008 || Kitt Peak || Spacewatch || — || align=right | 1.5 km || 
|-id=870 bgcolor=#E9E9E9
| 489870 ||  || — || April 7, 2008 || Kitt Peak || Spacewatch || MRX || align=right data-sort-value="0.97" | 970 m || 
|-id=871 bgcolor=#E9E9E9
| 489871 ||  || — || April 5, 2008 || Mount Lemmon || Mount Lemmon Survey || EUN || align=right | 1.1 km || 
|-id=872 bgcolor=#E9E9E9
| 489872 ||  || — || April 7, 2008 || Kitt Peak || Spacewatch || — || align=right | 1.9 km || 
|-id=873 bgcolor=#E9E9E9
| 489873 ||  || — || March 30, 2008 || Kitt Peak || Spacewatch || (5) || align=right data-sort-value="0.84" | 840 m || 
|-id=874 bgcolor=#E9E9E9
| 489874 ||  || — || April 11, 2008 || Kitt Peak || Spacewatch || — || align=right | 2.7 km || 
|-id=875 bgcolor=#E9E9E9
| 489875 ||  || — || February 12, 2008 || Mount Lemmon || Mount Lemmon Survey || — || align=right | 2.2 km || 
|-id=876 bgcolor=#E9E9E9
| 489876 ||  || — || April 12, 2008 || Catalina || CSS || — || align=right | 2.4 km || 
|-id=877 bgcolor=#E9E9E9
| 489877 ||  || — || April 10, 2008 || Kitt Peak || Spacewatch || — || align=right | 1.9 km || 
|-id=878 bgcolor=#E9E9E9
| 489878 ||  || — || April 6, 2008 || Kitt Peak || Spacewatch || MRX || align=right data-sort-value="0.83" | 830 m || 
|-id=879 bgcolor=#C2FFFF
| 489879 ||  || — || April 1, 2008 || Kitt Peak || Spacewatch || L5 || align=right | 8.3 km || 
|-id=880 bgcolor=#E9E9E9
| 489880 ||  || — || April 3, 2008 || Kitt Peak || Spacewatch || GEF || align=right | 1.1 km || 
|-id=881 bgcolor=#E9E9E9
| 489881 ||  || — || April 24, 2008 || Kitt Peak || Spacewatch || — || align=right | 2.2 km || 
|-id=882 bgcolor=#E9E9E9
| 489882 ||  || — || April 24, 2008 || Kitt Peak || Spacewatch || — || align=right | 1.9 km || 
|-id=883 bgcolor=#E9E9E9
| 489883 ||  || — || April 3, 2008 || Mount Lemmon || Mount Lemmon Survey || — || align=right | 2.0 km || 
|-id=884 bgcolor=#E9E9E9
| 489884 ||  || — || April 26, 2008 || Kitt Peak || Spacewatch || — || align=right | 2.4 km || 
|-id=885 bgcolor=#FFC2E0
| 489885 ||  || — || April 29, 2008 || Kitt Peak || Spacewatch || AMO || align=right data-sort-value="0.66" | 660 m || 
|-id=886 bgcolor=#fefefe
| 489886 ||  || — || April 8, 2008 || Kitt Peak || Spacewatch || — || align=right data-sort-value="0.65" | 650 m || 
|-id=887 bgcolor=#E9E9E9
| 489887 ||  || — || March 6, 2008 || Mount Lemmon || Mount Lemmon Survey || — || align=right | 2.1 km || 
|-id=888 bgcolor=#E9E9E9
| 489888 ||  || — || April 29, 2008 || Kitt Peak || Spacewatch || — || align=right | 1.8 km || 
|-id=889 bgcolor=#E9E9E9
| 489889 ||  || — || April 30, 2008 || Kitt Peak || Spacewatch || — || align=right | 1.9 km || 
|-id=890 bgcolor=#E9E9E9
| 489890 ||  || — || March 11, 2008 || Catalina || CSS || — || align=right | 2.4 km || 
|-id=891 bgcolor=#E9E9E9
| 489891 ||  || — || April 29, 2008 || Kitt Peak || Spacewatch || — || align=right | 1.8 km || 
|-id=892 bgcolor=#E9E9E9
| 489892 ||  || — || April 1, 2008 || Kitt Peak || Spacewatch || AEO || align=right | 1.1 km || 
|-id=893 bgcolor=#E9E9E9
| 489893 ||  || — || May 3, 2008 || Kitt Peak || Spacewatch || — || align=right | 1.9 km || 
|-id=894 bgcolor=#E9E9E9
| 489894 ||  || — || April 15, 2008 || Mount Lemmon || Mount Lemmon Survey || — || align=right | 2.4 km || 
|-id=895 bgcolor=#E9E9E9
| 489895 ||  || — || May 5, 2008 || Mount Lemmon || Mount Lemmon Survey || JUN || align=right | 1.1 km || 
|-id=896 bgcolor=#E9E9E9
| 489896 ||  || — || April 15, 2008 || Kitt Peak || Spacewatch || — || align=right | 1.9 km || 
|-id=897 bgcolor=#E9E9E9
| 489897 ||  || — || April 26, 2008 || Kitt Peak || Spacewatch || — || align=right | 1.9 km || 
|-id=898 bgcolor=#E9E9E9
| 489898 ||  || — || May 8, 2008 || Kitt Peak || Spacewatch || — || align=right | 2.0 km || 
|-id=899 bgcolor=#d6d6d6
| 489899 ||  || — || May 15, 2008 || Mount Lemmon || Mount Lemmon Survey || BRA || align=right | 1.2 km || 
|-id=900 bgcolor=#FFC2E0
| 489900 ||  || — || May 27, 2008 || Mount Lemmon || Mount Lemmon Survey || APOcritical || align=right data-sort-value="0.59" | 590 m || 
|}

489901–490000 

|-bgcolor=#E9E9E9
| 489901 ||  || — || April 30, 2008 || Mount Lemmon || Mount Lemmon Survey || — || align=right | 1.6 km || 
|-id=902 bgcolor=#E9E9E9
| 489902 ||  || — || May 30, 2008 || Kitt Peak || Spacewatch || EUN || align=right | 1.2 km || 
|-id=903 bgcolor=#E9E9E9
| 489903 ||  || — || May 29, 2008 || Kitt Peak || Spacewatch || — || align=right | 2.4 km || 
|-id=904 bgcolor=#E9E9E9
| 489904 ||  || — || May 29, 2008 || Mount Lemmon || Mount Lemmon Survey || — || align=right | 2.5 km || 
|-id=905 bgcolor=#fefefe
| 489905 ||  || — || May 30, 2008 || Kitt Peak || Spacewatch || — || align=right | 1.2 km || 
|-id=906 bgcolor=#E9E9E9
| 489906 ||  || — || April 16, 2008 || Mount Lemmon || Mount Lemmon Survey || — || align=right | 2.3 km || 
|-id=907 bgcolor=#d6d6d6
| 489907 ||  || — || July 28, 2008 || La Sagra || OAM Obs. || — || align=right | 2.4 km || 
|-id=908 bgcolor=#d6d6d6
| 489908 ||  || — || July 29, 2008 || Mount Lemmon || Mount Lemmon Survey || — || align=right | 3.3 km || 
|-id=909 bgcolor=#E9E9E9
| 489909 ||  || — || July 30, 2008 || Kitt Peak || Spacewatch || — || align=right data-sort-value="0.81" | 810 m || 
|-id=910 bgcolor=#fefefe
| 489910 ||  || — || July 29, 2008 || Kitt Peak || Spacewatch || — || align=right data-sort-value="0.57" | 570 m || 
|-id=911 bgcolor=#fefefe
| 489911 ||  || — || July 30, 2008 || Kitt Peak || Spacewatch || — || align=right data-sort-value="0.48" | 480 m || 
|-id=912 bgcolor=#E9E9E9
| 489912 ||  || — || May 29, 2008 || Mount Lemmon || Mount Lemmon Survey ||  || align=right | 2.8 km || 
|-id=913 bgcolor=#fefefe
| 489913 ||  || — || August 1, 2008 || Socorro || LINEAR || — || align=right data-sort-value="0.67" | 670 m || 
|-id=914 bgcolor=#fefefe
| 489914 ||  || — || August 6, 2008 || La Sagra || OAM Obs. || — || align=right data-sort-value="0.85" | 850 m || 
|-id=915 bgcolor=#fefefe
| 489915 ||  || — || July 1, 2008 || Kitt Peak || Spacewatch || NYS || align=right data-sort-value="0.54" | 540 m || 
|-id=916 bgcolor=#fefefe
| 489916 ||  || — || August 2, 2008 || La Sagra || OAM Obs. || — || align=right data-sort-value="0.60" | 600 m || 
|-id=917 bgcolor=#d6d6d6
| 489917 ||  || — || August 26, 2008 || La Sagra || OAM Obs. || — || align=right | 4.1 km || 
|-id=918 bgcolor=#fefefe
| 489918 ||  || — || August 26, 2008 || La Sagra || OAM Obs. || — || align=right data-sort-value="0.70" | 700 m || 
|-id=919 bgcolor=#d6d6d6
| 489919 ||  || — || August 24, 2008 || La Sagra || OAM Obs. || Tj (2.97) || align=right | 3.1 km || 
|-id=920 bgcolor=#d6d6d6
| 489920 ||  || — || August 26, 2008 || Socorro || LINEAR || — || align=right | 3.6 km || 
|-id=921 bgcolor=#E9E9E9
| 489921 ||  || — || August 26, 2008 || Socorro || LINEAR || — || align=right | 2.2 km || 
|-id=922 bgcolor=#fefefe
| 489922 ||  || — || August 29, 2008 || La Sagra || OAM Obs. || — || align=right data-sort-value="0.50" | 500 m || 
|-id=923 bgcolor=#d6d6d6
| 489923 ||  || — || August 24, 2008 || La Sagra || OAM Obs. || — || align=right | 3.3 km || 
|-id=924 bgcolor=#E9E9E9
| 489924 ||  || — || August 26, 2008 || La Sagra || OAM Obs. || — || align=right | 1.5 km || 
|-id=925 bgcolor=#fefefe
| 489925 ||  || — || August 24, 2008 || Kitt Peak || Spacewatch || critical || align=right data-sort-value="0.82" | 820 m || 
|-id=926 bgcolor=#fefefe
| 489926 ||  || — || September 2, 2008 || Kitt Peak || Spacewatch || — || align=right data-sort-value="0.56" | 560 m || 
|-id=927 bgcolor=#d6d6d6
| 489927 ||  || — || September 2, 2008 || Kitt Peak || Spacewatch || — || align=right | 2.5 km || 
|-id=928 bgcolor=#E9E9E9
| 489928 ||  || — || September 4, 2008 || Kitt Peak || Spacewatch || — || align=right | 1.1 km || 
|-id=929 bgcolor=#fefefe
| 489929 ||  || — || August 24, 2008 || Kitt Peak || Spacewatch || critical || align=right data-sort-value="0.62" | 620 m || 
|-id=930 bgcolor=#FA8072
| 489930 ||  || — || September 5, 2008 || La Sagra || OAM Obs. || — || align=right data-sort-value="0.86" | 860 m || 
|-id=931 bgcolor=#fefefe
| 489931 ||  || — || September 2, 2008 || Kitt Peak || Spacewatch || — || align=right data-sort-value="0.57" | 570 m || 
|-id=932 bgcolor=#E9E9E9
| 489932 ||  || — || September 2, 2008 || Kitt Peak || Spacewatch || — || align=right data-sort-value="0.67" | 670 m || 
|-id=933 bgcolor=#fefefe
| 489933 ||  || — || September 2, 2008 || Kitt Peak || Spacewatch || MAS || align=right data-sort-value="0.60" | 600 m || 
|-id=934 bgcolor=#C2FFFF
| 489934 ||  || — || September 2, 2008 || Kitt Peak || Spacewatch || L4 || align=right | 7.0 km || 
|-id=935 bgcolor=#d6d6d6
| 489935 ||  || — || September 4, 2008 || Kitt Peak || Spacewatch || — || align=right | 2.8 km || 
|-id=936 bgcolor=#E9E9E9
| 489936 ||  || — || September 5, 2008 || Kitt Peak || Spacewatch || (5) || align=right data-sort-value="0.66" | 660 m || 
|-id=937 bgcolor=#E9E9E9
| 489937 ||  || — || September 5, 2008 || Kitt Peak || Spacewatch || — || align=right | 1.4 km || 
|-id=938 bgcolor=#d6d6d6
| 489938 ||  || — || September 5, 2008 || Kitt Peak || Spacewatch || EOS || align=right | 1.7 km || 
|-id=939 bgcolor=#fefefe
| 489939 ||  || — || July 29, 2008 || Kitt Peak || Spacewatch || MAS || align=right data-sort-value="0.59" | 590 m || 
|-id=940 bgcolor=#fefefe
| 489940 ||  || — || August 7, 2008 || Kitt Peak || Spacewatch || — || align=right data-sort-value="0.59" | 590 m || 
|-id=941 bgcolor=#C2FFFF
| 489941 ||  || — || September 2, 2008 || Kitt Peak || Spacewatch || L4 || align=right | 7.9 km || 
|-id=942 bgcolor=#d6d6d6
| 489942 ||  || — || September 4, 2008 || Kitt Peak || Spacewatch || — || align=right | 2.4 km || 
|-id=943 bgcolor=#C2FFFF
| 489943 ||  || — || September 5, 2008 || Kitt Peak || Spacewatch || L4 || align=right | 8.5 km || 
|-id=944 bgcolor=#fefefe
| 489944 ||  || — || September 5, 2008 || Kitt Peak || Spacewatch || (2076) || align=right data-sort-value="0.80" | 800 m || 
|-id=945 bgcolor=#d6d6d6
| 489945 ||  || — || September 3, 2008 || Kitt Peak || Spacewatch || — || align=right | 2.6 km || 
|-id=946 bgcolor=#fefefe
| 489946 ||  || — || September 4, 2008 || Kitt Peak || Spacewatch || — || align=right data-sort-value="0.65" | 650 m || 
|-id=947 bgcolor=#E9E9E9
| 489947 ||  || — || September 4, 2008 || Kitt Peak || Spacewatch || — || align=right | 1.2 km || 
|-id=948 bgcolor=#E9E9E9
| 489948 ||  || — || September 5, 2008 || Kitt Peak || Spacewatch || — || align=right | 1.6 km || 
|-id=949 bgcolor=#C2FFFF
| 489949 ||  || — || September 5, 2008 || Kitt Peak || Spacewatch || L4 || align=right | 6.8 km || 
|-id=950 bgcolor=#d6d6d6
| 489950 ||  || — || September 6, 2008 || Mount Lemmon || Mount Lemmon Survey || — || align=right | 2.2 km || 
|-id=951 bgcolor=#C2FFFF
| 489951 ||  || — || September 2, 2008 || Kitt Peak || Spacewatch || L4 || align=right | 6.1 km || 
|-id=952 bgcolor=#C2FFFF
| 489952 ||  || — || September 5, 2008 || Kitt Peak || Spacewatch || L4 || align=right | 7.5 km || 
|-id=953 bgcolor=#d6d6d6
| 489953 ||  || — || September 6, 2008 || Kitt Peak || Spacewatch || — || align=right | 2.7 km || 
|-id=954 bgcolor=#E9E9E9
| 489954 ||  || — || September 6, 2008 || Mount Lemmon || Mount Lemmon Survey || — || align=right | 1.4 km || 
|-id=955 bgcolor=#E9E9E9
| 489955 ||  || — || September 2, 2008 || Kitt Peak || Spacewatch || — || align=right data-sort-value="0.84" | 840 m || 
|-id=956 bgcolor=#E9E9E9
| 489956 ||  || — || September 5, 2008 || La Sagra || OAM Obs. || — || align=right | 1.3 km || 
|-id=957 bgcolor=#fefefe
| 489957 ||  || — || September 5, 2008 || Socorro || LINEAR || — || align=right data-sort-value="0.55" | 550 m || 
|-id=958 bgcolor=#E9E9E9
| 489958 ||  || — || September 7, 2008 || Mount Lemmon || Mount Lemmon Survey || — || align=right data-sort-value="0.56" | 560 m || 
|-id=959 bgcolor=#E9E9E9
| 489959 ||  || — || September 22, 2008 || Socorro || LINEAR || ADE || align=right | 1.9 km || 
|-id=960 bgcolor=#d6d6d6
| 489960 ||  || — || August 24, 2008 || La Sagra || OAM Obs. || — || align=right | 3.0 km || 
|-id=961 bgcolor=#E9E9E9
| 489961 ||  || — || September 19, 2008 || Kitt Peak || Spacewatch || — || align=right data-sort-value="0.83" | 830 m || 
|-id=962 bgcolor=#d6d6d6
| 489962 ||  || — || September 20, 2008 || Kitt Peak || Spacewatch || — || align=right | 2.7 km || 
|-id=963 bgcolor=#E9E9E9
| 489963 ||  || — || September 20, 2008 || Kitt Peak || Spacewatch || — || align=right data-sort-value="0.62" | 620 m || 
|-id=964 bgcolor=#d6d6d6
| 489964 ||  || — || September 6, 2008 || Catalina || CSS || — || align=right | 3.0 km || 
|-id=965 bgcolor=#E9E9E9
| 489965 ||  || — || September 20, 2008 || Kitt Peak || Spacewatch || — || align=right data-sort-value="0.75" | 750 m || 
|-id=966 bgcolor=#fefefe
| 489966 ||  || — || September 6, 2008 || Mount Lemmon || Mount Lemmon Survey || — || align=right data-sort-value="0.68" | 680 m || 
|-id=967 bgcolor=#d6d6d6
| 489967 ||  || — || September 20, 2008 || Kitt Peak || Spacewatch || — || align=right | 3.7 km || 
|-id=968 bgcolor=#fefefe
| 489968 ||  || — || September 20, 2008 || Mount Lemmon || Mount Lemmon Survey || — || align=right data-sort-value="0.66" | 660 m || 
|-id=969 bgcolor=#E9E9E9
| 489969 ||  || — || September 20, 2008 || Mount Lemmon || Mount Lemmon Survey ||  || align=right | 1.2 km || 
|-id=970 bgcolor=#E9E9E9
| 489970 ||  || — || September 20, 2008 || Mount Lemmon || Mount Lemmon Survey || — || align=right | 2.5 km || 
|-id=971 bgcolor=#d6d6d6
| 489971 ||  || — || September 5, 2008 || Kitt Peak || Spacewatch || — || align=right | 2.0 km || 
|-id=972 bgcolor=#E9E9E9
| 489972 ||  || — || September 21, 2008 || Kitt Peak || Spacewatch || (5) || align=right data-sort-value="0.78" | 780 m || 
|-id=973 bgcolor=#d6d6d6
| 489973 ||  || — || August 24, 2008 || Kitt Peak || Spacewatch || — || align=right | 2.8 km || 
|-id=974 bgcolor=#E9E9E9
| 489974 ||  || — || September 20, 2008 || Kitt Peak || Spacewatch || — || align=right | 1.3 km || 
|-id=975 bgcolor=#fefefe
| 489975 ||  || — || September 21, 2008 || Kitt Peak || Spacewatch || H || align=right data-sort-value="0.58" | 580 m || 
|-id=976 bgcolor=#E9E9E9
| 489976 ||  || — || September 21, 2008 || Kitt Peak || Spacewatch || — || align=right data-sort-value="0.94" | 940 m || 
|-id=977 bgcolor=#E9E9E9
| 489977 ||  || — || September 21, 2008 || Kitt Peak || Spacewatch || — || align=right data-sort-value="0.72" | 720 m || 
|-id=978 bgcolor=#E9E9E9
| 489978 ||  || — || September 7, 2008 || Mount Lemmon || Mount Lemmon Survey || — || align=right | 1.6 km || 
|-id=979 bgcolor=#d6d6d6
| 489979 ||  || — || September 22, 2008 || Kitt Peak || Spacewatch || — || align=right | 2.3 km || 
|-id=980 bgcolor=#d6d6d6
| 489980 ||  || — || September 22, 2008 || Mount Lemmon || Mount Lemmon Survey || — || align=right | 2.7 km || 
|-id=981 bgcolor=#fefefe
| 489981 ||  || — || September 22, 2008 || Mount Lemmon || Mount Lemmon Survey || — || align=right data-sort-value="0.62" | 620 m || 
|-id=982 bgcolor=#d6d6d6
| 489982 ||  || — || September 22, 2008 || Mount Lemmon || Mount Lemmon Survey || — || align=right | 2.3 km || 
|-id=983 bgcolor=#E9E9E9
| 489983 ||  || — || September 6, 2008 || Mount Lemmon || Mount Lemmon Survey || — || align=right | 1.8 km || 
|-id=984 bgcolor=#d6d6d6
| 489984 ||  || — || September 22, 2008 || Mount Lemmon || Mount Lemmon Survey || — || align=right | 2.5 km || 
|-id=985 bgcolor=#E9E9E9
| 489985 ||  || — || September 22, 2008 || Kitt Peak || Spacewatch || — || align=right | 1.6 km || 
|-id=986 bgcolor=#E9E9E9
| 489986 ||  || — || September 24, 2008 || Mount Lemmon || Mount Lemmon Survey || — || align=right data-sort-value="0.66" | 660 m || 
|-id=987 bgcolor=#fefefe
| 489987 ||  || — || September 21, 2008 || Kitt Peak || Spacewatch || — || align=right data-sort-value="0.48" | 480 m || 
|-id=988 bgcolor=#fefefe
| 489988 ||  || — || September 29, 2008 || Kachina || J. Hobart || — || align=right data-sort-value="0.73" | 730 m || 
|-id=989 bgcolor=#d6d6d6
| 489989 ||  || — || September 3, 2008 || Kitt Peak || Spacewatch || — || align=right | 3.4 km || 
|-id=990 bgcolor=#d6d6d6
| 489990 ||  || — || September 23, 2008 || Socorro || LINEAR || Tj (2.93) || align=right | 3.4 km || 
|-id=991 bgcolor=#d6d6d6
| 489991 ||  || — || September 28, 2008 || Socorro || LINEAR || — || align=right | 3.5 km || 
|-id=992 bgcolor=#fefefe
| 489992 ||  || — || September 22, 2008 || Kitt Peak || Spacewatch || — || align=right data-sort-value="0.75" | 750 m || 
|-id=993 bgcolor=#d6d6d6
| 489993 ||  || — || July 30, 2008 || Kitt Peak || Spacewatch || — || align=right | 3.6 km || 
|-id=994 bgcolor=#E9E9E9
| 489994 ||  || — || September 23, 2008 || Catalina || CSS || — || align=right | 1.7 km || 
|-id=995 bgcolor=#fefefe
| 489995 ||  || — || September 24, 2008 || Mount Lemmon || Mount Lemmon Survey || — || align=right data-sort-value="0.82" | 820 m || 
|-id=996 bgcolor=#d6d6d6
| 489996 ||  || — || September 25, 2008 || Kitt Peak || Spacewatch || VER || align=right | 2.3 km || 
|-id=997 bgcolor=#fefefe
| 489997 ||  || — || September 25, 2008 || Kitt Peak || Spacewatch || — || align=right data-sort-value="0.75" | 750 m || 
|-id=998 bgcolor=#d6d6d6
| 489998 ||  || — || September 25, 2008 || Kitt Peak || Spacewatch || — || align=right | 2.8 km || 
|-id=999 bgcolor=#d6d6d6
| 489999 ||  || — || September 26, 2008 || Kitt Peak || Spacewatch || — || align=right | 2.5 km || 
|-id=000 bgcolor=#fefefe
| 490000 ||  || — || September 26, 2008 || Kitt Peak || Spacewatch || — || align=right data-sort-value="0.51" | 510 m || 
|}

References

External links 
 Discovery Circumstances: Numbered Minor Planets (485001)–(490000) (IAU Minor Planet Center)

0489